= Tyla discography =

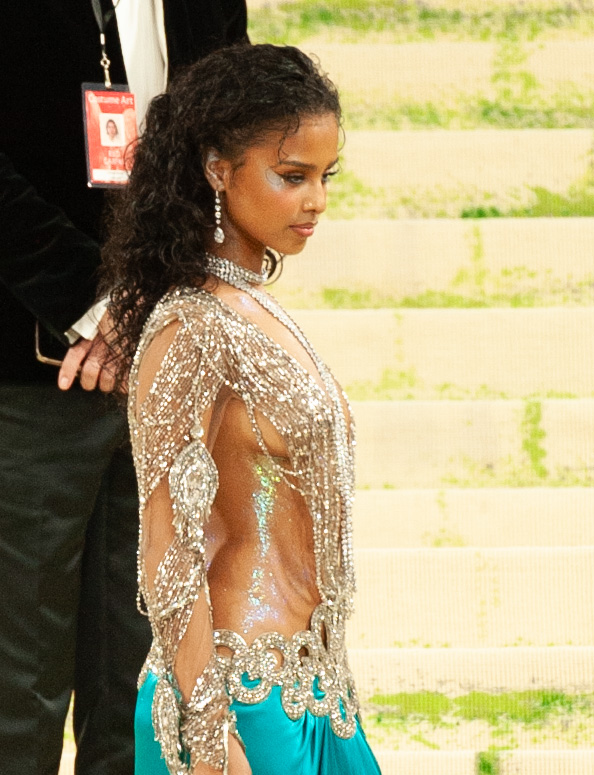
- Tyla at the 2026 Met Gala
- Studio albums: 2
- EPs: 2
- Singles: 26
- Music videos: 25
- Promotional singles: 4

The discography of South African singer and songwriter Tyla comprises two studio albums, two extended plays (EPs), twenty-five singles (including four as a featured artist), four promotional singles and twenty-five music videos. Tyla released her debut self-titled studio album on 22 March 2024, which incorporated her digital EP of the same name released on 1 December 2023. The album debuted at number 24 on the US Billboard 200 chart. It was supported by four singles: "Water", which reached the top 10 in multiple countries and earned multi-platinum certifications in several regions, "Truth or Dare", "Art" and "Jump". The deluxe edition of the album, released on 11 October 2024, was certified gold in Norway and included the single "Push 2 Start", which debuted at number 88 on the US Billboard Hot 100 chart.

In 2025, as Tyla prepared for her debut mixtape's release, she contributed to a film soundtrack and collaborated with several artists. She was featured on "When I'm with You" by Thai musician Lisa of Blackpink from her debut solo studio album, Alter Ego. She contributed to the remix of WizTheMc's "Show Me Love" and she appeared on the Smurfs (2025) film soundtrack with the song "Everything Goes with Blue". Tyla appeared on "PBT", a single from the second compilation album by American rapper Travis Scott and the JackBoys.

Tyla debuted "Bliss", her first solo single since her 2024 self-titled debut studio album, on 9 May 2025, after an unauthorized tease during her April Coachella set. The single reached number 34 on the Official South African Charts and number 4 on the UK Afrobeats Singles Chart. On 11 July 2025, Tyla released "Is It" accompanied by a music video directed by Aerin Moreno, who also directed "Push 2 Start". "Is It" garnered 1,274,357 Spotify streams in its first 24 hours, marking Tyla's biggest platform debut as of July 2025, with its YouTube video amassing 762,000 views on release day. The track topped the UK Afrobeats Singles Chart and reached number 7 in South Africa. Marketed as We Wanna Party, Tyla's second EP, WWP, was released on 25 July 2025, featuring Nigerian singer Wizkid. The EP earned positive reviews, with critics praising Tyla's vocal performance, though some noted her Coloured identity might affect her U.S. reception. However, WWP faced criticism for not charting on the US Billboard 200, selling 3,700 units in its first week. That same month, Tyla announced a mixtape featuring "Bliss" and "Is It" via social media with a pre-save link.

She contributed to "Nice Guy" from Cardi B's second studio album, Am I the Drama? American rapper Yung Miami accused Tyla of stealing "Chanel" prior to its release.

== Studio albums ==
List of studio albums, showing selected details, chart positions and certifications
Title	Details	Peak chart positions										Certifications
Title	Details	AUS	CAN	GER	IRE	NLD	NOR	NZ	SWI	UK	US	Certifications
Tyla	Released: 22 March 2024; Label: FAX, Epic; Formats: CD, digital download, streaming, vinyl	48	26	86	59	11	19	16	12	19	24	RiSA: Gold; BPI: Gold; IFPI NOR: Gold (Note: Tyla +); IFPI SWI: Gold; MC: Platinum; NVPI: Platinum; RIAA: Gold; RMNZ: Platinum
A*Pop	Released: 24 July 2026; Label: FAX, Epic; Formats: CD, digital download, streaming	28	—	37	—	64	—	21	19	43	43	

== Extended plays ==
List of EPs, with release date, label, selected chart positions, and certifications shown
Title	EP details	Peak chart positions	Sales
Title	EP details	US World	Sales
Tyla	Released: 1 December 2023; Label: FAX, Epic; Format: Digital download, streaming	—	
WWP	Released: 25 July 2025; Label: FAX, Epic; Format: Digital download, streaming	11	US: 3,700
"—" denotes items which were not released in that country or failed to chart.

== Singles ==
=== As lead artist ===
List of singles as lead artist with title, year, peak chart positions, certifications, and album
Title	Year	Peak chart positions										Certifications	Album
Title	Year	SA	AUS	CAN	NLD	NGR	NZ	UK	US	US Afro.	WW	Certifications	Album
"Getting Late" (featuring Kooldrink)	2019	—	—	—	—	—	—	—	—	—	—		Non-album single
"Overdue" (featuring DJ Lag and Kooldrink)	2021	—	—	—	—	—	—	—	—	—	—		Blood & Water: Season 2
"Been Thinking"	2023	—	—	—	—	—	—	—	— (Note: "Been Thinking" did not enter the Billboard Hot 100, but peaked at number 36 on the Mainstream R&B/Hip-Hop Airplay chart.)	43	—		Non-album singles
"Girl Next Door" (featuring Ayra Starr)	2023	—	—	—	—	—	—	— (Note: "Girl Next Door" did not enter the Official UK Charts, but peaked at number 14 on the Official UK Afrobeats Chart.)	—	35	—		Non-album singles
"Water"	2023	3	6	15	6	13	1	4	7	1	6	RiSA: 4× Platinum; ARIA: 4× Platinum; BPI: 2× Platinum; MC: 4× Platinum; NVPI: Platinum; RIAA: 4× Platinum; RMNZ: 4× Platinum; TCSN: Gold	Tyla
"Truth or Dare"	2024	15	—	—	— (Note: "Truth or Dare" did not enter the Dutch Single Top 100, but peaked at number five on the Dutch Single Tip chart.)	—	— (Note: "Truth or Dare" did not enter the NZ Top 40 Singles Chart, but peaked at number 11 on the NZ Hot Singles Chart.)	— (Note: "Truth or Dare" did not enter the Official UK Charts, but peaked at number 1 on the Official UK Afrobeats Chart)	— (Note: "Truth or Dare" did not enter the Billboard Hot 100, but peaked at number four on the Bubbling Under Hot 100 chart.)	3	—	BPI: Silver; MC: Gold; RIAA: Gold; RMNZ: Platinum	Tyla
"Art"	2024	11	—	—	—	61	— (Note: "Art" did not enter the NZ Top 40 Singles Chart, but peaked at number 18 on the NZ Hot Singles Chart.)	85	—	4	—	RIAA: Gold; RMNZ: Gold	Tyla
"Jump" (with Gunna and Skillibeng)	2024	18	—	87	51	57	— (Note: "Jump" did not enter the NZ Top 40 Singles Chart, but peaked at number 22 on the NZ Hot Singles Chart.)	38	—	3	195	BPI: Silver; MC: Gold; RIAA: Gold; RMNZ: Gold	Tyla
"One Call" (with Spinall and Omah Lay)	2024	—	—	—	—	35	—	—	—	12	—		Non-album single
"Push 2 Start" (solo or featuring Sean Paul)	2024	3	44	70	38	30	20	23	88	1	70	BPI: Gold; MC: Gold; RIAA: Platinum; RMNZ: Platinum	Tyla +
"Bliss"	2025	34	—	—	—	—	— (Note: "Bliss" did not enter the NZ Top 40 Singles Chart, but peaked at number 18 on the NZ Hot Singles Chart.)	—	—	—	—		WWP
"Is It"	2025	7	—	—	— (Note: "Is It" did not enter the Dutch Single Top 100 chart, but peaked at number 26 on the Single Tip chart.)	69	— (Note: "Is It" did not enter the NZ Top 40 Singles Chart, but peaked at number 10 on the NZ Hot Singles Chart.)	99	—	—	—		WWP and A*Pop
"Dynamite" (with Wizkid)	2025	45	—	—	—	13	— (Note: "Dynamite" did not enter the NZ Top 40 Singles Chart, but peaked at number 18 on the NZ Hot Singles Chart.)	—	—	2	—		WWP
"PBT" (with Travis Scott and Vybz Kartel)	2025	—	—	—	—	—	—	—	—	—	—		JackBoys 2
"Talk to Me" (with Damiano David and Nile Rodgers)	2025	—	—	—	— (Note: "Talk to Me" did not enter the Dutch Single Top 100, but peaked at number 11 on the Dutch Single Tip chart.)	—	—	—	—	—	—		Funny Little Fears (Dreams)
"Body Go" (with Moliy)	2025	— (Note: "Game Time" did not enter the Local & International Chart, but peaked at number 17 on the Local and International Radio Chart Top 20.)	—	—	—	31	—	—	—	9	—		Non-album single
"Chanel"	2025	25	15	22	19	29	16	15	43	1	11	ARIA: Gold; BPI: Silver; RIAA: Gold; RMNZ: Gold	A*Pop
"She Did It Again" (featuring Zara Larsson)	2026	9	87	55	62	62	— (Note: "She Did It Again" did not enter the NZ Top 40 Singles Chart, but peaked at number 3 on the NZ Hot Singles Chart.)	40	59	—	74		A*Pop
"Game Time" (with Future)	2026	82	—	—	—	76	— (Note: "Game Time" did not enter the NZ Top 40 Singles Chart, but peaked at number 11 on the NZ Hot Singles Chart.)	—	— (Note: "Game Time" did not enter the Billboard Hot 100, but peaked at number four on the Bubbling Under Hot 100 chart.)	—	—		Official FIFA World Cup 2026 Album
"Is It Love"	2026	17	—	—	—	—	— (Note: "Is It Love" did not enter the NZ Top 40 Singles Chart, but peaked at number 8 on the NZ Hot Singles Chart.)	—	—	1	—		A*Pop
"That Girl"	2026	5	—	—	—	41	— (Note: "That Girl" did not enter the NZ Top 40 Singles Chart, but peaked at number 13 on the NZ Hot Singles Chart.)	—	—	—	—		A*Pop
"—" denotes items which were not released in that country or failed to chart.

=== As featured artist ===
List of singles as featured artist with title, year, and album
Title	Year	Peak chart positions		Album
Title	Year	IRE	NGR	Album
"Thata Ahh" (ShaunMusiq, Ftears, and DJ Maphorisa featuring Young Stunna, Madumane and Tyla)	2022	—	—	Thatha Ushaka
"Ke Shy" (Major Lazer and Major League DJz featuring Tyla, Luudadeejay and Yumbs)	2023	—	—	Piano Republik
"Bana Ba" (Daliwonga featuring ShaunMusiq, Ftears, Tyla and TitoM)	2023	—	—	Dali Dali
"Show Me Love (Tyla Remix)" WizTheMc, Bees & Honey featuring Tyla	2025	16	59	Yebo!
"Memories" (Lojay featuring Tyla)	2025	—	93	XOXO

=== Promotional singles ===
List of promotional singles with title, year, peak chart positions and album
Title	Year	Peak chart positions		Album
Title	Year	UK Afro.	US Afro.	Album
"To Last"	2022	—	16	Tyla
"On and On"	2023	16	10	Tyla
"Butterflies"	2023	—	—	Tyla
"Tears"	2024	11	—	Non-album single
"—" denotes items which were not released in that country or failed to chart.

== Other charted songs ==
List of other charted songs with title, year, peak chart positions and album
Title	Year	Peak chart positions								Album
Title	Year	SA	NZ Hot	SWE	THA	UK Afro.	US Bub.	US Afro.	US R&B/HH	Album
"Safer"	2024	—	36	—	—	—	—	8	—	Tyla
"No. 1" (featuring Tems)	2024	—	26	—	—	—	—	5	—	Tyla
"On My Body" (with Becky G)	2024	—	—	—	—	—	—	10	—	Tyla
"Priorities"	2024	—	—	—	—	—	—	13	—	Tyla
"Breathe Me"	2024	—	—	—	—	—	—	11	—	Tyla
"Back to You"	2024	—	—	—	—	13	—	8	—	Tyla +
"Shake Ah" (featuring Tony Duardo, Optimist ZA, and Ez Maestro)	2024	—	—	—	—	—	—	9	—	Tyla +
"When I'm with You" (Lisa featuring Tyla)	2025	—	22	—	6	—	—	—	—	Alter Ego
"Mr. Media"	2025	27	—	—	—	—	—	8	—	WWP
"Nice Guy" (Cardi B featuring Tyla)	2025	40	—	—	—	—	8	—	38	Am I the Drama?
"Hot & Sexy" (with Zara Larsson)	2026	—	—	89	—	—	—	—	—	Midnight Sun: Girls Trip
"Crazy of Me" (featuring MaWhoo)	2026	51	—	—	—	—	—	9	—	A*Pop
"I Don't Care" (featuring Babalwa M)	2026	48	—	—	—	—	—	7	—	A*Pop
"Kiss"	2026	31	—	—	—	—	—	—	—	A*Pop
"Feel Something"	2026	66	—	—	—	—	—	—	—	A*Pop
"Double Blind"	2026	19	—	—	—	—	—	—	—	A*Pop
"Right Now"	2026	50	—	—	—	—	—	—	—	A*Pop
"Mr. Nonchalant"	2026	20	—	—	—	20	—	—	—	A*Pop
"Hot Tubs"	2026	76	—	—	—	—	—	—	—	A*Pop
"—" denotes items which were not released in that country or failed to chart.

== Guest appearances ==
List of guest appearances with title, year, other artists and album
Title	Year	Other artist(s)	Album
"Ngowam"	2022	Kelvin Momo	Amukelani
"Amawele"	2022	Marioo	The Kid You Know
"Girls Need Love" (Girls Mix)	2023	Summer Walker	Non-album song
"When I'm with You"	2025	Lisa	Alter Ego
"Show Me Love" (remix)	2025	WizTheMc, Bees & Honey	Non-album song
"Everything Goes with Blue"	2025	none	Smurfs Movie Soundtrack (Music From & Inspired By)
"Pum Pum Jump"	2025	Teyana Taylor and Jill Scott	Escape Room
"Memories"	2025	Lojay	XOXO
"Hot & Sexy" (Girls Trip)	2026	Zara Larsson	Midnight Sun: Girls Trip

== Music videos ==
=== As lead artist ===
List of music videos, showing year released, directors and artists.
Year	Title	Director(s)	Artist(s)	Ref.
2021	"Getting Late"	Tyla	Tyla featuring Kooldrink	
2021	"Overdue"	Garth Von Glen	Tyla featuring DJ Lag and Kooldrink	
2023	"Been Thinking"	Meji Alabi	Tyla	
2023	"Water"	Child	Tyla	
2024	"Truth or Dare"	Nabil	Tyla	
2024	"Water" (remix)	Nabil	Tyla and Travis Scott	
2024	"Art"	Nabil	Tyla	
2024	"Jump"	Nabil	Tyla, Gunna and Skillibeng	
2024	"One Call"	UAX	Tyla, Spinall and Omah Lay	
2024	"Breathe Me"	Nabil	Tyla	
2024	"Push 2 Start"	Aerin Moreno	Tyla	
2024	"Shake Ah"	Taylor Fauntleroy	Tyla, Tony Duardo, Optimist and Ez Maestro	
2025	"Push 2 Start" (remix)	Tyla and Taylor Flauntleroy	Tyla and Sean Paul	
2025	"Show Me Love" (remix)	Unknown	WizTheMc, bees & honey and Tyla	
2025	"Bliss"	Director X	Tyla	
2025	"Is It"	Aerin Moreno	Tyla	
2025	"Dynamite"	Nabil	Tyla and Wizkid	
2025	"Talk to Me"	Shake Plastik Dreamer	Damiano David, Tyla and Nile Rodgers	
2025	"Body Go"	Nathan Tettey	Moliy and Tyla	
2025	"Chanel"	Aerin Moreno	Tyla	
2025	"PBT"	Nabil	Travis Scott, Tyla & Vybz Kartel	
2026	"She Did it Again"	Aerin Moreno	Tyla featuring Zara Larsson	
2026	"Game Time"	Yeiid	Tyla and Future	
2026	"Is It Love"	Aerin Moreno	Tyla	

=== As featured artist ===
List of music videos, showing year released, directors and artists.
Year	Title	Director(s)	Artist(s)	Ref.
2025	"When I'm with You"	Olivia De Camps	Lisa featuring Tyla	
