= We Wanna Party Tour =

2025 concert tour by Tyla

- Continental tour by Tyla
- Promotional poster for the first five shows announced
- Location: Asia
- Associated album: WWP
- Start date: 11 November 2025
- End date: 14 December 2025
- Legs: 1
- No. of shows: 8
- Box office: $2,062,943 (3 reported shows)
- Website: wewannaparty.asia

Tyla concert chronology
- Tyla Tour (2024–2025); We Wanna Party Tour (2025); The A*Pop World Tour (2026-2027)

The We Wanna Party Tour was the first major concert tour by South African singer Tyla, in support of her second extended play (EP), WWP (2025). The tour commenced in Tokyo, Japan on 11 November 2025, and concluded in Bahrain on 14 December 2025.

== Development ==
Between 2024 and 2025, following the release of her debut album Tyla (2024), the singer had planned to embark on a world tour to promote the record. However, the tour was cancelled due to an injury sustained by the artist. Between December 2024 and January 2025, Tyla performed a series of concerts in South Africa, which served as a prelude to her Tyla Tour, scheduled for 2025. On 28 July 2025, the singer released her EP WWP, which had originally been announced as a mixtape.

On 1 August 2025, Tyla announced via her Instagram story that she would embark on the We Wanna Party Tour in Asia, with some dates revealed by promoters. On 4 August, Tyla revealed the full tour dates and announced that she would be revealing more dates soon. Artist presale information was announced at the same time. Additionally, Tyla was announced as the headliner at Sole DXB in Dubai and Soundstorm in Riyadh. On 25 November 2025, Tyla announced a Bahrain date.

== Set list ==
Set list adapted from Apple Music.

1. "Is It"
2. "Getting Late"
3. "To Last"
4. "Art
5. "Bliss"
6. "Priorities"
7. "On My Body"
8. "Safer"
9. "Dynamite"
10. "Jump"
11. "Mr Media"
12. "On and On"
13. "Truth or Dare"
14. "Show Me Love"
15. "Bana Ba"
16. "Shake Ah"
17. "Ke Shy"
18. "Thata Ahh"
19. "Chanel"
20. "Water"
21. "Breathe Me"
22. "Push 2 Start"

== Tour dates ==
List of concerts
Date	City	Country	Venue	Attendance	Revenue
11 November	Tokyo	Japan	Ariake Arena	9,050 / 9,050	$1,175,124
3 December	Pasay (Note: Labelled as Manila in promotional material.)	Philippines	SM Mall of Asia Arena	5,356 / 6,292	$502,612
5 December	Tampines	Singapore	Arena @ Expo	3,617 / 3,918	$385,207
7 December (Note: The 7 December 2025, concert is set to be a part of Indian Sneaker Festival.)	Mumbai	India	MMRDA Grounds	—	—
9 December	Bahrain		Beyon Al Dana Amphitheatre	—	—
11 December (Note: The 11 December 2025, concert is set to be a part of Soundstorm.)	Riyadh	Saudi Arabia	BanBan	—	—
13 December (Note: The 13 December 2025, concert is set to be a part of Sole DXB.)	Dubai	United Arab Emirates	Dubai Design District	—	—
14 December	Bahrain		Beyon Al Dana Amphitheatre	—	—

=== Cancelled shows ===
Date	City	Country	Venue	Reason	Ref.
14 November	Bangkok (Note: Labelled as Bangkok in promotional material.)	Thailand	Impact Challenger – Hall 3	Death and funeral of Sirikit	
23 November	Chek Lap Kok	Hong Kong	AsiaWorld-Expo – Hall 10	Unknown	
29 November	Tangerang (Note: Labelled as Jakarta in promotional material.)	Indonesia	Nice Pik 2 – Hall 11	Unexpected schedule changes	
