= Chanel (Tyla song) =

Single by Tyla

from the album A*Pop
- Released: 24 October 2025
- Genre: Afrobeats; amapiano; pop
- Length: 3:08
- Label: FAX; Epic
- Songwriters: Ian Kirkpatrick; Douglas Ford; Tyla Seethal; Bardriia Bourelly; Richard Olowaranta Mbu Isong
- Producers: P2J; Ian Kirkpatrick

Tyla singles chronology
"Memories" (2025)	"Chanel" (2025)	"She Did It Again" (2026)

Music video
- "Chanel" on YouTube

"Chanel" is a song by South African singer Tyla from her second studio album, A*Pop. It was released on 24 October 2025, through FAX and Epic Records, as the lead single from the album. The upbeat track blends Afrobeats, amapiano, and pop genres. Lyrically, it demands luxury treatment in a relationship, centred on the hook "How you say you love me? You ain't put me in Chanel". It was produced by Ian Kirkpatrick and P2J, both of whom also contributed to the songwriting alongside Douglas Ford, and Bibi Bourelly.

Originally previewed alongside "Dynamite" at a fan event in Berlin in July 2025 and intended for Tyla's second EP, WWP (2025), the song was further teased at the Global Citizen Festival in September 2025. The high-fashion music video, directed with vintage Chanel pieces styled by Ron Hartleben, premiered on release day. Tyla first performed it live on her We Wanna Party Tour in Tokyo in November 2025. The release also attracted attention for a public controversy in which American rapper Yung Miami accused Tyla of appropriating the concept from her own unreleased track "Take Me to Chanel", claiming she had privately shared her version with Tyla beforehand. The dispute generated significant online discussion, though Tyla did not respond publicly and no legal action followed.

Commercially, "Chanel" reached the top 10 in Malaysia, the Philippines, Saudi Arabia, Singapore, Suriname, and the United Arab Emirates, the top 20 in Australia, New Zealand, South Africa, and the UK, the top 40 in Nigeria and the top 50 in the Netherlands and Switzerland. On the Billboard Global 200, "Chanel" became Tyla's highest charting song since "Water" (2023), peaking at number 11. The song also debuted at number 94 and peaked at number 43 on the Billboard Hot 100, making it her third entry after "Push 2 Start" (2024) and "Water".

== Background and release ==
At an exclusive fan listening event in Berlin in July 2025, Tyla unveiled two songs, "Dynamite" and "Chanel". Both were originally intended for inclusion on her second extended play (EP), WWP, which was described by Tyla during an interview with Variety in August 2025, as "a bridge to the album". The EP was released on 25 July 2025, and featured "Dynamite" as a collaboration with Wizkid, but did not include "Chanel".

During her set at the Global Citizen Festival on 27 September 2025, in Central Park, New York, Tyla once again shared a preview of the song with its music video. On 15 October 2025, Tyla announced on social media that "Chanel" would be released as a single on 24 October 2025, and shared a pre-save link. The song's music video was released on the same day, and features Tyla wearing vintage Chanel clothing from the "early 1990s to the mid-2010s", styled by Ron Hartleben.

=== Controversy ===
After the song's release, American rapper Yung Miami, formerly of City Girls, took to X (formerly Twitter) to accuse Tyla of stealing her song. She stated: "This girl really ran off with my song, and I don't know how to feel about it. Mind you, I played this song for her", accompanied by thinking emojis, before adding, "I'm confused!". Fans commented that Yung Miami had delayed releasing her own version of the song, to which she responded, "Don't matter it's my mf song!!!" She also mentioned that she had played the track for Tyla. Tyla did not respond to the claims through a public response on social media or through her representatives.

== Composition ==
"Chanel" is an upbeat Afrobeats song, with elements of Amapiano and pop. In an interview with Vogue, Tyla described the song lyrically as "not only about spoiling me; it’s about being treated like luxury [and] being the gift". Chris DeVille from Stereogum described "Chanel" as having a "hypnotic hook" and a "skittering beat", with the track having "contagious energy".

== Commercial performance ==
On the Billboard Global 200, "Chanel" reached number 11, becoming Tyla's highest-charting entry since "Water" (2023). In the United Kingdom, "Chanel" debuted at number 81 on the UK Singles Chart for the chart week ending 27 November 2025. Six weeks later, it rose to a new peak of number 15. In Switzerland, the song reached number 50 on the Swiss Singles Chart, as well as in France, in the first week of 2026. Elsewhere, "Chanel" peaked at number 15 in Australia, and number 54 in Canada. In the United States, "Chanel" debuted at number 94 on the Billboard Hot 100 and later rose to number 43. It became the first solo song by an African artist to chart on the Billboard Hot 100 since her own "Push 2 Start" in March 2025, which itself was the first such entry since "Water" in April 2024. As a result, no African act other than Tyla achieved a solo entry on the chart for 118 consecutive weeks. With these chart performances, Tyla extended her record as the South African solo artist with the most cumulative weeks on the Billboard Hot 100 (37 weeks) and set a new record as the female African artist with the most solo entries in the chart’s history (three), surpassing Miriam Makeba, who had held the record for nearly 57 years. The song also peaked atop Rhythmic Airplay becoming her second number one hit on the chart after "Water".

In the Philippines, "Chanel" reached number 11 the Philippines Hot 100, and number 14 on the Official Philippines Chart. In Malaysia, "Chanel" became Tyla's first entry on the Billboard Malaysia Songs chart, where it debuted at number 16; additionally it reached number eight on the country's main singles chart. In South Africa, "Chanel" reached number 1 on the Official South African Airplay Chart, and in Nigeria the song reached number 29 on the TurnTable Top 100 chart. Additionally, "Chanel" became Tyla's third number one on the Billboard US Afrobeats Songs chart, and her seventh number one on the UK Afrobeats Singles Chart. As of April 2026, the song had accumulated over 16.8 million video creations on TikTok, ranking 50th among the most-used songs on the platform worldwide.

== Accolades ==
Awards and nominations received by Tyla
Award	Year (Note: Indicates the year of ceremony. Each year is linked to the article about the awards held that year, wherever possible.)	Category	Result	Ref.
American Music Awards	2026	Best Music Video	Nominated	
American Music Awards	2026	Social Song of the Year	Won	
BET Awards	2026	Viewer's Choice Award	Nominated	
BET Awards	2026	Video of the Year	Nominated	
Music Awards Japan	2026	Best International R&B/Contemporary Song in Japan	Won	
Soul Train Music Awards	2026	R&B/Soul Song of The Year	Pending	

== Credits and personnel ==
Credits were adapted from Apple Music.

Musicians

- Tyla – songwriter, performer
- Ian Kirkpatrick – songwriter, producer
- Douglas Ford – songwriter
- Bardriia Bourelly – songwriter
- P2J – producer, songwriter

Technical

- Colin Leonard – mastering engineer
- Leandro "Dro" Hidalgo – mixing engineer

== Charts ==
=== Weekly charts ===
Chart (2025–2026)	Peak position
Australia (ARIA)	15
Australia Hip Hop/R&B (ARIA)	2
Austria (Ö3 Austria Top 40)	39
Belgium (Ultratop 50 Wallonia)	29
Bolivia Anglo Airplay (Monitor Latino)	3
Canada Hot 100 (Billboard)	22
Canada CHR/Top 40 (Billboard)	31
Central America Anglo Airplay (Monitor Latino)	1
Colombia Anglo Airplay (Monitor Latino)	3
CIS Airplay (TopHit)	84
Costa Rica Anglo Airplay (Monitor Latino)	1
Dominican Republic Anglo Airplay (Monitor Latino)	1
Ecuador Anglo Airplay (Monitor Latino)	8
El Salvador Anglo Airplay (Monitor Latino)	1
Estonia Airplay (TopHit)	20
Finland Airplay (Radiosoittolista)	65
France (SNEP)	50
Germany (GfK)	34
Global 200 (Billboard)	11
Greece International (IFPI)	14
Guatemala Airplay (Monitor Latino)	8
Honduras Anglo Airplay (Monitor Latino)	1
India International (IMI)	2
Ireland (IRMA)	33
Israel (Mako Hitlist)	85
Jamaica Airplay (JAAMS)	1
Japan Hot Overseas (Billboard Japan)	13
Latin America Anglo Airplay (Monitor Latino)	4
Lebanon (Lebanese Top 20)	12
Lithuania (AGATA)	85
Lithuania Airplay (TopHit)	83
Luxembourg (Billboard)	20
Malaysia (IFPI)	5
Malaysia International (RIM)	3
Malta Airplay (Radiomonitor)	16
Mexico Anglo Airplay (Monitor Latino)	10
Middle East and North Africa (IFPI)	5
Netherlands (Dutch Top 40)	24
Netherlands (Single Top 100)	19
New Zealand (Recorded Music NZ)	15
Nicaragua Anglo Airplay (Monitor Latino)	1
Nigeria (TurnTable Top 100)	29
Nigeria Airplay (TurnTable)	12
Norway (VG-lista)	53
Panama International (PRODUCE)	48
Peru Airplay (Monitor Latino)	14
Philippines (IFPI)	4
Philippines Hot 100 (Billboard Philippines)	4
Portugal (AFP)	49
Puerto Rico Anglo Airplay (Monitor Latino)	2
Romania Airplay (Media Forest)	9
Saudi Arabia (IFPI)	10
Serbia Airplay (Radiomonitor)	7
Singapore (RIAS)	6
South Africa Airplay (TOSAC)	1
South Africa Domestic Airplay (TOSAC)	1
South Africa Streaming (TOSAC)	24
South Korea (Circle)	196
Suriname (Nationale Top 40)	3
Sweden (Sverigetopplistan)	28
Switzerland (Schweizer Hitparade)	23
Turkey International Airplay (Radiomonitor Türkiye)	9
United Arab Emirates (IFPI)	3
UK Singles (Official Charts)	15
UK Afrobeats (Official Charts)	1
UK Hip Hop/R&B (Official Charts)	3
US Billboard Hot 100	43
US Afrobeats Songs (Billboard)	1
US Adult Contemporary (Billboard)	11
US Pop Airplay (Billboard)	21
US Rhythmic Airplay (Billboard)	1
US World Digital Song Sales (Billboard)	1
Venezuela Anglo Airplay (Monitor Latino)	3

=== Monthly charts ===
Chart (2026)	Peak position
CIS Airplay (TopHit)	89
Estonia Airplay (TopHit)	24
Romania Airplay (TopHit)	21

== Certifications ==
Certifications for "Chanel"
Region	Certification	Certified units/sales
Australia (ARIA)	Gold	35,000^{‡}
Belgium (BRMA)	Gold	20,000^{‡}
France (SNEP)	Gold	100,000^{‡}
New Zealand (RMNZ)	Gold	15,000^{‡}
Portugal (AFP)	Gold	12,000^{‡}
South Africa (RISA)	Platinum	40,000^{‡}
Switzerland (IFPI Switzerland)	Gold	15,000^{‡}
United Kingdom (BPI)	Silver	200,000^{‡}
United States (RIAA)	Gold	500,000^{‡}
^{‡} Sales+streaming figures based on certification alone.

== Release history ==
Release history for "Chanel"
Region	Date	Format(s)	Label(s)	Ref.
Various	24 October 2025	Digital download; streaming	FAX; Epic	
Italy	12 December 2025	Radio airplay	Sony Italy	
United States	13 January 2026	Contemporary hit radio	Epic	
United States	13 January 2026	Rhythmic contemporary radio	Epic	
Various	April 2026	7-inch	Sony	
