= Mr. Media =

Song by Tyla

from the EP WWP
- Genre: Amapiano; Afrobeats
- Length: 3:01
- Label: FAX; Epic
- Songwriters: Tyla Laura Seethal; Ariowa Irosogie; Imani Lewis; Corey Marlon Lindsay-Keay; Samuel Awuku; Linda Mnisi
- Producers: Sammy SoSo; Ari PenSmith; Mocha Bands; Believve; Troy Taylor

"Mr. Media" (stylized in all caps) is a song recorded and released by South African singer Tyla from her second extended play, WWP, on 24 July 2025, through FAX and Epic Records.

== Release ==
"MR. MEDIA" was initially intended for Tyla's debut mixtape which was later canned to a 4-track EP. The song is the EP's only non-single recording. The lyrics focus on criticism and media tabloids surrounding the singer's life and career growth. A music video for the song was intend for release in September 2025, but was scratched due to heavy criticism around the EP's release.

== Reception ==
The song was released to critical acclaim, with many praising Tyla's energy on the song and the ability to clap back to the constant criticism. American rapper, Doechii, praised the song and described it as an Afrobeats diss-track, aimed at haters who were largely criticising the singer for many reasons, such as identifying as a South African Coloured, which is considered a racial slur in the USA, instead of identifying as a Black person. The song was also consider as a clap back to American rapper and podcaster, Joe Budden, after his comments on Tyla denying being Afrobeats artist at the 2024 MTV Video Music Awards.

== Live performances ==
Tyla first performed the song on the Last Leg of her Promotional Tour Tyla Tour in Europe, later on her first headline tour We Wanna Party Tour in Asia, and the Afrobeats Music Festival held in Morocco in June 2026.

She went on to perform the song in New York City at Global Citizen Festival. During her performance, in the song's intro, Tyla remarked "Sorry, I'm not sorry, hey!", sparking online controversy, with many speculating it was aimed at Nigerian singer and songwriter, Tiwa Savage, who earlier apologised on the former's behalf for "failing" to respect Black American culture, indirectly referring to Tyla not identifying as a Black woman, while she was on The Breakfast Club.

== Charts ==
Weekly chart performance for "Mr Media"
Chart (2025)	Peak position
South Africa Streaming (TOSAC)	27
US Afrobeats Songs (Billboard)	8
