= WWP (EP) =

EP by Tyla
- Released: 25 July 2025
- Genre: Amapiano
- Length: 11:23
- Labels: FAX; Epic
- Producers: Ari PenSmith; Believve; Dylan Wiggins; Mocha Bands; Nolan Lambroza; Nova Wav; P.Priime; Sammy Soso

Tyla chronology
Tyla (2024)	WWP (2025)	A*Pop (2026)

Singles from WWP
- 1. "Bliss" Released: 9 May 2025; 2. "Is It" Released: 11 July 2025; 3. "Dynamite" Released: 24 July 2025

WWP, marketed as We Wanna Party, is the second extended play (EP) by South African singer Tyla. It was released on 25 July 2025, through FAX and Epic Records. The EP is primarily an amapiano record, with elements of pop and R&B in its production. Exploring themes of celebration and love, Tyla co-wrote each song on the EP while production was handled by collaborators including Sammy Soso, Ari PenSmith, Believve, Mocha Bands, and Sir Nolan.

WWP was preceded by the release of three singles: the lead single "Bliss" was released on 9 May 2025, followed by the second single "Is It" on 11 July, with the latter becoming Tyla's third top ten song in her native South Africa, and fifth number one on the UK Afrobeats Singles Chart. The third single, "Dynamite" featuring Nigerian singer Wizkid, was released on 24 July, and reached number 13 in Nigeria, while becoming the record's second number one on the UK Afrobeats Singles Chart.

WWP earned generally positive reviews, with critics praising Tyla's vocal performance and the EP's production. Commercially, the EP reached number 11 on the US Billboard World Albums chart. To promote the release, Tyla held exclusive listening events in London and Berlin and launched the We Wanna Party Tour, which began on 11 November 2025 in Tokyo.

== Background and release ==
In 2024, Tyla released her self-titled debut studio album, primarily a blend of pop and amapiano, with elements of R&B and Afrobeats, which explores themes of empowerment and relationships. The album received widespread critical acclaim, with reviewers praising her versatility in blending multiple genres. The album propelled Tyla to mainstream fame and earned multiple certifications across various territories.

Preceded by singles, "Bliss" and "Is It", Tyla took to social media to announce the mixtape with a pre-save link in July 2025. Tyla hosted an exclusive fan listening event in Berlin. That same month, she unveiled two new songs intended for the project titled "Dynamite" and "Chanel", the latter of which was released as a stand-alone single on 24 October 2025.

On 25 July, Tyla released the WWP EP, initially intended as the first part of an upcoming mixtape titled We Wanna Party. According to the description of WWP on Apple Music, the EP is a teaser of the full-length LP record. During an interview with Variety in August 2025, Tyla described the project as "a bridge to the album" and stated that "[she] wanted to have music out there that felt like who [she is] right now", commenting that the tracks are "summer-banger worthy" and that she needed to "let those ideas out before the album came".

=== Singles ===
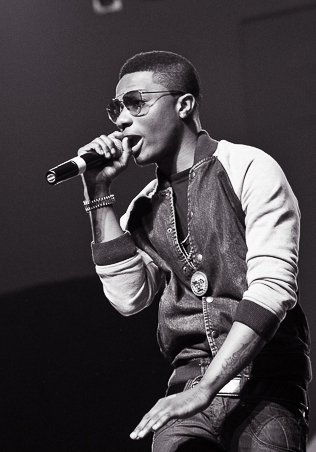
Wizkid was the only featured artist on the project, appearing on the song "Dynamite".

"Bliss" was teased during Tyla's 2025 Coachella set in April without the consent of her team, and it was later released on 9 May 2025. That same year on 20 May, it impacted the rhythmic contemporary radio in the U.S. through Epic Records. The song was also serviced to the contemporary hit radio in Italy by Sony Music Italy on 23 May, and in the U.S. by Epic Records on 27 May. "Bliss" debuted at number 34 on the Official South African Charts, number 3 on the UK Afrobeats Singles Chart. In the U.S. peaked at number 28 on the US Pop Airplay and number 14 on the Rhythmic chart. Directed by Director X, the music video for "Bliss" premiered on YouTube on 2 June 2025.

Accompanied by a music video directed by Aerin Moreno, who also directed "Push 2 Start", "Is It" was released on 11 July 2025. It received 1,274,357 streams on Spotify after a whole day of tracking, making it her biggest debut on the platform as of 12 July. Its music video amassed 762,000 views on YouTube on the first day of the song's release. "Is It" debuted atop the UK Afrobeats Singles Chart, number 99 on the UK Singles Chart and number 7 in South Africa. It impacted the rhythmic crossover frequencies on 12 August 2025. "Dynamite" with Wizkid was released as a standalone single on 24 July of that same year. Tyla teased the song during her listening party in London in July 2025, and also revealed that it is from a 2022 demo.

== Composition ==
WWP is an 11-minute, 23-second EP centered on partying, while exploring themes of love and celebration, and addressing media scrutiny. It was produced by Dylan Wiggins, Nova Wav, P.Priime and frequent collaborators such as Sammy Soso, Ari PenSmith, Believve, Mocha Bands and Sir Nolan, with additional production by Troy Taylor and Jo Caleb. Tyla blends amapiano's rhythmic pulses with pop-infused R&B and flowing melodies. Opening with "Dynamite" alongside Wizkid, the duo exchange seductive lyrics and blend their vocal tones. On "Mr. Media", she tackles the scrutiny of fame, singing, "No matter how hard I try, I can never get it right". A live crowd chants "Woza", Zulu for "come".

== Promotion ==
To promote the EP, in July 2025, Tyla hosted private listening events in London and Berlin. She announced the We Wanna Party Tour, a concert tour that began on 11 November in Tokyo, Japan. That year on 4 August, the singer took to Twitter to announce that she will be revealing more dates soon.

=== Performances and controversy ===
On 21 August 2025, Tyla performed "Mr. Media" in São Paulo, Brazil, and addressed a social media feud regarding her identity, stating that, "too many people [are] lying on my name".

Tyla faced backlash after she appeared on The Breakfast Club on 13 June 2024, where host Charlamagne tha God asked her directly about her ethnicity. Tyla did not respond, but her management intervened during the conversation. Hours after the interview was published online, Tyla took to Twitter to clarify that she never denied her Black identity. In September 2025, Nigerian singer Tiwa Savage sparked controversy during her appearance on The Breakfast Club, where she apologised on behalf of Tyla for identifying as Coloured. During Tyla's performance at the Global Citizen Festival in Central Park, New York on 27 September 2025, she performed "Mr. Media" and responded to Tiwa with, "Sorry, not sorry".

== Commercial performance ==
WWP failed to chart on the US Billboard 200, where it moved 3,700 album-equivalent units in its first week. It debuted at number 11 on the US Billboard World Albums chart.

=== Reaction ===
Following the low sales figures of the EP, Tyla faced backlash as a debate emerged over whether her career was in decline. Speaking to City Press in August 2025, music executives broke down the metrics and mechanics of the modern music industry. Goodwin Nkuna, a sales and product manager at Gallo Records, explained that "Music released to YouTube carries a lower value", in comparison to other streaming platforms. According to him, Spotify streams are framed as being "stronger than YouTube streams", while Apple Music streams are considered "even stronger", and Spotify is "split between paying subscribers and ad-supported streams" whereas Apple Music's model relies entirely on paid subscriptions.

Writing for OkayAfrica, Tseliso Monaheng added that, against this backdrop, the narrative of a "flop" is "an unfair and outdated assessment". As noted by him, it is rooted in "old-school thinking about sales", and it "completely disregard the new reality of music consumption". Instead, Tyla's success is framed through "her ability to generate millions of streams, chart internationally, and maintain cultural relevance". Charlamagne criticized Tyla's record label for failing to promote the EP. He stated that he doesn't believe the race conversation caused the album's poor performance, but rather that the label "wasn't doing any work".

== Critical reception ==
Professional ratings
Review scores
Source	Rating
Afrocritik	7.3/10
NME	4/5 stars
HotNewHipHop	3/5 stars

WWP received generally positive reviews from music critics. Writing for Afrocritik, Yinoluwa Olowofoyeku wrote that "it is catchy, colourful, rhythmically infectious, and it plays to Tyla's strengths as a modern pop star".

Tami Makinde of NME awarded the project 4 out of 5 stars, praising its "gleeful and hedonistic" tone and describing it as a confident, dance-floor-ready collection that prioritises fun. While noting that the release's brevity occasionally works against it compared to Tyla's debut studio album, Makinde commended her vocal versatility and ability to fuse amapiano, Afropop, and R&B. She concluded that although the project "might not make any grand statements", Tyla's charisma and celebratory approach make it a strong addition to her catalogue. Writing for Clash magazine, Shazaib Husaib described WWP as a four-track "transitional" project that builds on the club-ready sound of Tyla's debut. The article highlighted the inclusion of previous singles "Is It" and "Bliss", as well as the Wizkid collaboration "Dynamite", which combines Spanish guitar with Afrobeats percussion. Husaib framed the EP as the first glimpse into Tyla's post-debut studio sessions and a confident step forward ahead of her upcoming festival performances. Bryson "Boom" Paul of HotNewHipHop gave the EP a 3 out of 5 rating, commending the "sleek and playful" collaboration with Wizkid and the seductive "Mr. Media", but suggesting it serves more as a teaser for her upcoming sophomore album than a standalone triumph.

== Track listing ==
WWP track listing
No.	Title	Writer(s)	Producer(s)	Length
1.	"Dynamite" (with Wizkid)	Tyla Seethal; Ayodeji Ibrahim Balogun; Corey Marlon Lindsay-Keay; Bibi Bourelly; Peace Oredope; Adekunle Emmanuel Oluwaseyi; Elvis Chimezie Akujobi; Jo Caleb	P.Priime; Troy Taylor^{[a]}; Jo Caleb^{[b]}	2:57
2.	"Mr. Media"	Seethal; Ariowa Irosogie; Imani Lewis; Corey Marlon Lindsay-Keay; Samuel Awuku; Linda Mnisi	Sammy SoSo; Ari PenSmith; Mocha Bands; Believve; Troy Taylor^{[a]}	3:01
3.	"Is It"	Seethal; Ariowa Irosogie; Imani Lewis; Corey Marlon Lindsay-Keay; Samuel Awuku; Kaine	Sammy SoSo; Ari PenSmith; Mocha Bands; Believve	2:44
4.	"Bliss"	Seethal; Nolan Lambroza; Dylan Wiggins; Hailey Alexander; Mirtha Michelle Castro Marmol; Brittany "Chi" Coney; Denisia "Blu June" Andrews	Nolan Lambroza; Dylan Wiggins; Nova Wav; Troy Taylor^{[a]}	2:40
Total length:				11:23

=== Notes ===
- ^{^[a]} signifies a vocal producer.
- ^{^[b]} signifies an additional producer.

== Personnel ==
Credits were adapted from Tidal.

'Musicians

- Tyla – performer, songwriter (all)
- Wizkid – performer, songwriter (1)
- P.Priime – producer, songwriter (1)
- Corey Marlon Lindsay-Keay (1–3)
- Bibi Bourelly – songwriter (track 1)
- Adekunle Emmanuel Oluwaseyi – songwriter (1)
- Elvis Chimezie Akujobi – songwriter (1)
- Jo Caleb – songwriter, additional producer (1)
- Troy Taylor – vocal producer (1, 2, 4)
- Ari PenSmith – producer, songwriter (2, 3)
- Mocha Bands – producer, songwriter (2, 3)
- Believve – producer, songwriter (2, 3)
- Sammy Soso – producer, songwriter (2, 3)
- LeeMckrazy – songwriter (2)
- Nova Wav – producer (4)
- Nolan Lambroza – producer, songwriter (4)
- Dylan Wiggins – producer, songwriter (4)
- Hailey Alexander – songwriter (4)
- Brittany "Chi" Coney – songwriter (4)
- Denisia "Blu June" Andrews – songwriter (4)
- Mirtha Michelle Castro Marmol – songwriter (4)

Technical

- Colin Leonard – mastering engineer (all)
- Leandro "Dro" Hidalgo – mixing engineer (1–3)
- Charlie Rolfe – recording engineer (1)

== Charts ==
Weekly chart performance
Chart (2025)	Peak position
US World Albums (Billboard)	11

== Release history ==
Release history
Region	Date	Format	Edition	Label	Ref.
Various	25 July 2025	Digital download; streaming	EP	FAX; Epic	
