= Bliss (Tyla song) =

Single by Tyla

from the EP WWP
- Released: 9 May 2025
- Genre: Pop
- Length: 2:40
- Label: FAX; Epic
- Songwriters: Tyla Seethal; Nolan Lambroza; Dylan Wiggins; Hailey Alexander; Mirtha Michelle Castro Marmol; Brittany "Chi" Coney; Denisia "Blu June" Andrews
- Producers: Nolan Lambroza; Dylan Wiggins; Nova Wav

Tyla singles chronology
| "Show Me Love" (Remix) (2025) | "Bliss" (2025) | "Is It" (2025) |

Music video
- "Bliss" on YouTube

"Bliss" is a song recorded by South African singer Tyla. It was released on 9 May 2025 by FAX and Epic Records, as the lead single from her first extended play, WWP (2025). It is also her first solo single since the release of her self-titled debut studio album.

== Background ==
Tyla's self-titled debut album, released in 2024, featured hit singles such as "Water" and "Truth or Dare", with "Water" earning the inaugural Grammy Award for Best African Music Performance. Later that year, a deluxe edition of the album was released, which included the track "Push 2 Start". In addition, Tyla collaborated with K-pop artist Lisa on her debut album, Alter Ego, contributing to the song "When I'm with You".

== Release and music video ==
Tyla recorded her single "Bliss" with producers Nolan Lambroza, Dylan Wiggins, and Nova Wav. She previewed the track prior to its release and performed it live for the first time at Coachella in the previous month. Upon release, the song was described as a continuation of her signature slinky, rhythmic pop style. In a March 2025 interview with Billboard, Tyla confirmed that she is working on a new album. She noted a shift in her artistic direction, stating, "I've changed a lot in a short amount of time because I was kind of forced to with how fast I had to adapt to everything. I don't think it's going to be the same energy [as Tyla] at all, especially with what I've started making. It's different, but also still Tyla."

The video features Tyla crying while performing a choreography in a desert, as well as on a metal structure. Interspersed between this are scenes of Tyla hanging on a rope suspended in mid-air, and 2 Tylas singing the song. The video ends with her approaching a nuclear explosion, followed by the video fading to white.

== Live performances ==
Tyla teased the song during her Coachella 2025 set in April 2025, where she also previewed an unnamed song and live debuted her version of "Show Me Love" with South African rapper WizTheMc. She closed her 15-song set with "Water" and brought out surprise guest Becky G for a joint performance of "On My Body". Tyla is also set to perform "Bliss" at the Governors Ball Music Festival in New York City, taking the stage on the Friday of the event, which will be held at Flushing Meadows Corona Park from June 6 to 8.

== Composition ==
According to Stereogum, "Bliss" is a "slinky, physical pop anthem" that reflects Tyla's established musical identity. The track features off-kilter, amapiano-influenced drums that sharply contrast with her "pillowy" vocal delivery. This juxtaposition led the publication to compare the sound to that of Aaliyah, highlighting the song's atmospheric and textural sophistication.

== Personnel ==
Credits were adapted from Apple Music.

- Tyla Seethal – vocals, songwriter
- Nolan Lambroza – songwriter, producer
- Dylan Wiggins – songwriter, producer
- Hailey Alexander – songwriter
- Mirtha Michelle Castro Marmol – songwriter
- Brittany "Chi" Coney – songwriter
- Denisia "Blu June" Andrews – songwriter
- Nova Wav – producer

== Charts ==
Chart performance for "Bliss"
| Chart (2025) | Peak position |
|---|---|
| Japan Hot Overseas (Billboard Japan) | 7 |
| Lebanon English Airplay (Lebanese Top 20) | 19 |
| Lithuania Airplay (TopHit) | 85 |
| New Zealand Hot Singles (RMNZ) | 18 |
| Slovakia Airplay (ČNS IFPI) | 67 |
| South Africa Streaming (TOSAC) | 34 |
| South Africa Airplay (TOSAC) | 1 |
| UK Afrobeats (Official Charts) | 4 |
| US Hot R&B Songs (Billboard) | 11 |
| US Pop Airplay (Billboard) | 28 |
| US Rhythmic Airplay (Billboard) | 14 |

== Release history ==
Release history for "Bliss"
| Region | Date | Format(s) | Label(s) | Ref. |
|---|---|---|---|---|
| Various | 9 May 2025 | Digital download; streaming | FAX; Epic | |
| United States | 20 May 2025 | Rhythmic contemporary radio | Epic | |
| Italy | 23 May 2025 | Radio airplay | Sony Music Italy | |
| United States | 27 May 2025 | Contemporary hit radio | Epic | |
