= Is It =

Single by Tyla

from the EP WWP
- Released: 11 July 2025
- Genre: Brazilian funk; R&B; dancehall
- Length: 2:45
- Label: FAX; Epic
- Songwriters: Tyla Seethal; Sammy Soso; Ariowa Irosogie; Corey Marlon Lindsay-Keay; Imani Lewis; Kaine; Samuel Awaku
- Producers: Sammy Soso; Ari PenSmith; Belevve; Mocha Bands

Tyla singles chronology
"Bliss" (2025)	"Is It" (2025)	"Dynamite" (2025)

Music video
- "Is It" on YouTube

"Is It" is a song recorded by South African singer Tyla. It was released on 11 July 2025 by FAX and Epic Records, as the second single from her extended play, WWP (2025). It was also included on her second studio album A*Pop (2026). Tyla co-wrote the song with Ariowa Irosogie, Corey Marlon Lindsay-Keay, Imani Lewis, Kaine, Samuel Awaku, and frequent collaborator Sammy Soso, who also handled production, alongside Irosogie, Lewis and Lindsay-Keay.

"Is It" received positive reviews from critics, many of whom considered it as a contender for the song of the summer in 2025, and won the award at the 57th NAACP Image Awards for Outstanding International Song. Commercially, the song reached the top ten in South Africa, where it became Tyla's third top ten entry, and reached the top fifty on component charts in Australia, Germany, and New Zealand. In the United Kingdom, "Is It" became Tyla's fifth solo entry on the UK Singles Chart, and her fifth number one on the UK Afrobeats Singles Chart.

== Background ==
Tyla recorded "Is It" with producer Sammy Soso, AriPen Smith, Belevve and Mocha Bands. She teased the song on her TikTok before revealing its name. The song's demo quickly went viral before its full release, with many using it as celebratory sound on the app. The song was initially scheduled to be released on 27 June 2025, but was pushed back to 11 July 2025, with the music video being released simultaneously.

== Composition ==
"Is It" is a brazilian funk song, with elements of dancehall and R&B. According to Nmesoma Okechukwu of Euphoria magazine, "the synthy chorus and the scrambled vocals give it a defining edge, with producers Sammy Soso, Ari PenSmith, Believve, and Mocha Bands probably out to create a nontraditional bop".

== Music video ==
The music video for "Is It" was directed by Aerin Moreno, who also directed Tyla's "Push 2 Start" video, and premiered alongside the song on 11 July 2025. According to Maya Georgi of Rolling Stone, the visual "showcases her sharp Bacardi choreography. The Bacardi dance has become a staple of Tyla‘s, and has ties to the amapiano genre she has championed. By the end of the video, the singer has ignited an entire dance party with her spicy moves (and found a fresh pair of sunglasses)".

== Commercial performance ==
"Is It" received 1,274,357 streams on Spotify after a whole day of tracking, making it her biggest debut on the platform as of 31 October 2025, and has since amassed over 50 million streams on the service. Additionally, the song's music video amassed 762,000 views on YouTube on the first day of its release. "Is It" debuted atop the UK Afrobeats Singles Chart, number 99 on the UK Singles Chart and number 7 in South Africa. In the United States, "Is It" impacted the rhythmic crossover frequencies on 12 August 2025, reaching number 14 on the US Billboard Rhythmic Airplay chart.

== Personnel ==
Credits were adapted from Spotify.

- Tyla Seethal – vocals, songwriter, lyrics, melodies
- Sammy Awaku Soso – songwriter, producer, music
- AriPen Smith – songwriter, producer, music
- Corey Marlon "Belevve" Lindsay-Keay – songwriter, producer, music
- Imani "Mocha Bands" Lewis – songwriter, producer, music
- Kaine – songwriter, lyrics, melodies

== Charts ==
Chart performance for "Is It"
Chart (2025)	Peak position
Australia Hip Hop/R&B (ARIA)	38
Germany Urban (Deutsche Black Charts)	33
Greece International (IFPI)	54
Netherlands (Single Tip)	26
New Zealand Hot Singles (RMNZ)	10
Nigeria (TurnTable Top 100)	69
South Africa Streaming (TOSAC)	7
South Africa Airplay (TOSAC)	10
UK Singles (Official Charts)	99
UK Afrobeats (Official Charts)	1
UK Hip Hop/R&B (Official Charts)	29
US Rhythmic Airplay (Billboard)	14
Uruguay Anglo Airplay (Monitor Latino)	12

== Release history ==
Release history for "Is It"
Region	Date	Format(s)	Label(s)	Ref.
United States	12 August 2025	Rhythmic crossover	Epic	
