= MTV Video Music Award for Best Afrobeats Video =

Music video award

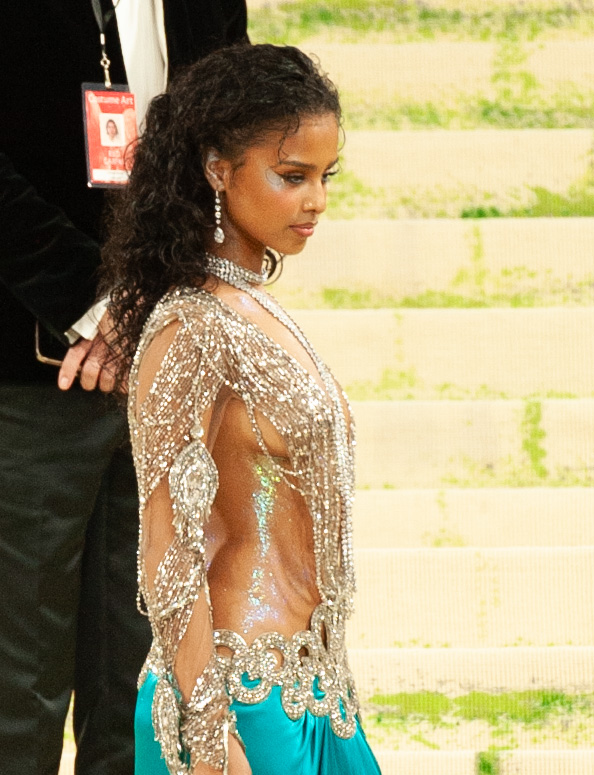
- Tyla is the most recent recipient for "Push 2 Start" (2025).
- Awarded for: Afrobeats music songs
- Country: United States
- Presented by: MTV
- First award: 2023
- Final award: 2025
- Currently held by: Tyla – "Push 2 Start" (2025)

Highlights
- Most wins: Tyla (2)
- Most nominations: Asake; Ayra Starr; Burna Boy; (3 each)
- Website: VMA website

The MTV Video Music Award for Best Afrobeats Video was an award presented at the MTV Video Music Awards by the organisation.It was first presented at the 2023 MTV Video Music Awards and last presented at the 2025 MTV Video Music Awards.

== Recipients ==
=== 2020s ===
Recipients
Year (Note: Each year is linked to the article about the MTV Video Music Awards held that year.)	Winner(s)	Video	Nominees	Ref.
2023	Rema and Selena Gomez	"Calm Down"	Ayra Starr – "Rush"; Burna Boy – "It's Plenty"; Davido (featuring Musa Keys) – "Unavailable"; Fireboy DML and Asake – "Bandana"; Libianca – "People"; Wizkid (featuring Ayra Starr) – "2 Sugar"	
2024	Tyla	"Water"	Ayra Starr (featuring Giveon) – "Last Heartbreak Song"; Burna Boy – "City Boys"; Chris Brown (featuring Davido and Lojay) – "Sensational"; Tems – "Love Me JeJe"; Usher and Pheelz – "Ruin"	
2025	Tyla	"Push 2 Start"	Asake and Travis Scott – "Active"; Burna Boy and Travis Scott – "TaTaTa"; Moliy, Silent Addy, Skillibeng and Shenseea – "Shake It to the Max (Fly)"; Rema – "Baby (Is It a Crime)"; Tems and Asake – "Get It Right"; Wizkid and Brent Faiyaz – "Piece of My Heart"	

== Statistics ==
=== Artists with multiple wins ===
2 wins

- Tyla

=== Artists with multiple nominations ===
3 nominations

- Asake
- Ayra Starr
- Burna Boy

2 nominations

- Davido
- Rema
- Tems
- Travis Scott
- Wizkid
- Tyla

== Tyla's response to win for 2024 Best Afrobeats Video ==
Tyla's music video for her song "Water" was the winner at the 2024 MTV Video Music Awards for MTV Video Music Award for Best Afrobeats Video. In her acceptance speech, Tyla chose to identify with South African "amapiano", distancing herself from Nigerian "afrobeats", which ended up causing mayhem on social media as Nigerian on-air personality Do2dtun went on to call Tyla a hypocrite for receiving the award for Best Afrobeats in the first place before identifying with Amapiano.

=== 'Uppity African' incident ===
Tyla was also heavily criticized on social media and by notable people such as American media personality Joe Budden, for not choosing to hold her award and instead giving it to rapper Lil Nas X, she stated "I’m not strong enough, please hold it for me, thank you I'm sorry." Many thought she was asking the person next to him, female singer Halle Bailey, known mononymously as Halle and labeled Tyla as "uppity african", a term meaning a person shows a great sense of entitlement. Tyla later confirmed she wasn't, in a post on X stating "Y’all make everything weird… I was not asking my girl Halle… We just girls," Halle later responded saying "Exactly, love u babes congrats.” American rapper Cardi B also came to the singer's defense.
