= Tyla Tour =

2024–2025 concert tour by Tyla

- Transcontinental tour by Tyla
- Location: Africa; North America; Europe
- Associated album: Tyla
- Start date: 5 December 2024
- End date: 23 August 2025
- No. of shows: 10
- Website: tyla.tours

Tyla concert chronology
- Tyla Tour (2024–2025); We Wanna Party Tour (2025)

The Tyla Tour was a promotional concert tour by South African singer Tyla in support of her debut studio album Tyla (2024). The tour was scheduled to commence on 21 March 2024 in Oslo, Norway, and conclude on 28 May 2024 in Minneapolis, United States. Two weeks before the tour was scheduled to start, Tyla announced that the European leg of the tour was postponed without further notice and the North American leg of the tour was cancelled due to an injury that the singer had been suffering with prior to the tour's commencement. The tour commenced in Cape Town, South Africa, on 5 December 2024 and concluded in London, England, on 23 August 2025.

== Background and promotion ==
The tour was supposed to visit both North America and Europe; however, there were no dates in Tyla's native South Africa. On 5 December 2023, Tyla took to Instagram to announce the tour along with the dates and cities prior to the release of her self-titled digital extended play (EP), scheduled to be included on her debut studio album Tyla (2024). The EP consists of the songs "Water", "Truth or Dare", "On and On", "Butterflies", and "Water (Remix)".

On 7 March 2024, exactly 2 weeks before the commence of the tour, Tyla took to Instagram to announce the cancelation of the North American leg of the tour entirely and plans to reschedule the European tour dates with a message that read:

My Tygers,

All of you know that this moment you have all helped me transform into a reality, has been life-long dream. I am so grateful and humbled by this past year and the way it's changed my life I can never thank you enough for all your loving support, all the joy, the laughter, and the wins!

As much as this is something I would rather have dealt with privately, its important that I share what I have to share with you today. For the past year I've been silently suffering with an injury that has tragically worsened. I've seen doctors and specialists with high hopes but the pain has only become more agonizing as has the severity of the situation.

I am absolutely heartbroken to have to say this as of right now I won't be able to proceed with the tour. In consulting with medical professionals it's become increasingly clear that continuing any festival or tour dates would jeopardize my long-term health and safety.

Words cannot describe my frustration at this pivotal point in my career. So please know that my team and I are working diligently on a spectacular show for you as soon as I am recovered and ready to return safely onstage this summer.

For North American headline dates, your tickets will automatically be refunded, for all other territories you will be contacted by your ticket provider regarding options, please keep a look out for new dates and information.

Later in October, she announced two shows to be held in South Africa, adding a second one in Pretoria due to demand. During 2025, she was also announced to perform at several European music festivals.

== Tour dates ==
Date	City	Country	Venue
5 December 2024	Cape Town	South Africa	Grand Arena
7 December 2024	Pretoria	South Africa	SunBet Arena
18 January 2025	Pretoria	South Africa	SunBet Arena
11 April 2025 (Note: The 11 April and 18 April 2025, concerts were part of Coachella Valley Music and Arts Festival.)	Indio	United States	Empire Polo Club
18 April 2025	Indio	United States	Empire Polo Club
6 June 2025 (Note: This concert was part of Governors Ball Music Festival.)	New York	United States	Flushing Meadows-Corona Park
3 July 2025 (Note: This concert was part of Open'er Festival.)	Gdynia	Poland	Gdynia-Kosakowo Airport
5 July 2025 (Note: This concert was part of Roskilde Festival.)	Roskilde	Denmark	Dyrskuepladsen
11 July 2025 (Note: This concert was part of Slottsfjellfestivalen.)	Tønsberg	Norway	Slottsfjell
23 August 2025 (Note: This concert was part of All Points East.)	London	England	Victoria Park

=== Cancelled and rescheduled concerts ===
List of cancelled and rescheduled concerts, showing date, city, country, venue, and reason
Date	City	Country	Venue	Reason
Cancelled (Note: 20 concert tour dates and venues in Germany (1), the United States (17), and Canada (2) were cancelled.)
27 March 2024	Cologne	Germany	Luxo	Cancelled due to injury
22 April 2024	San Francisco	United States	The Regency Ballroom	Cancelled due to injury
24 April 2024	Seattle	United States	The Showbox	Cancelled due to injury
26 April 2024	Portland	United States	Wonder Ballroom	Cancelled due to injury
28 April 2024	Vancouver	Canada	Commodore Ballroom	Cancelled due to injury
1 May 2024	Denver	United States	Cervantes’ Masterpiece Ballroom & Cervantes’ Other Side	Cancelled due to injury
3 May 2024	Austin	United States	Emo's Austin	Cancelled due to injury
4 May 2024	Dallas	United States	The Echo Lounge & Music Hall	Cancelled due to injury
6 May 2024	Houston	United States	White Oak Music Hall	Cancelled due to injury
7 May 2024	New Orleans	United States	The Joy Theater	Cancelled due to injury
9 May 2024	Miami Beach	United States	Miami Beach Bandshell	Cancelled due to injury
11 May 2024	Orlando	United States	The Plaza Live	Cancelled due to injury
13 May 2024	Atlanta	United States	Center Stage Theater	Cancelled due to injury
15 May 2024	Norfolk	United States	The NorVa	Cancelled due to injury
17 May 2024	Washington, D.C.	United States	9:30 Club	Cancelled due to injury
18 May 2024	Philadelphia	United States	Union Transfer	Cancelled due to injury
20 May 2024	Boston	United States	Paradise Rock Club	Cancelled due to injury
22 May 2024	Montreal	Canada	Théâtre Beanfield	Cancelled due to injury
23 May 2024	Toronto	Canada	The Danforth Music Hall	Cancelled due to injury
28 May 2024	Minneapolis	United States	Varsity Theater	Cancelled due to injury
14 June 2025 (Note: This concert was supposed to be a part of Bonnaroo.)	Manchester	United States	Great Stage Park	Cancelled due to flooding
Rescheduled to The A*Pop World Tour (Note: 7 concert tour dates and venues in Europe were rescheduled as part of The A*Pop World Tour.)
12 October 2026 (Note: The concert on 12 October 2026 at Zénith Paris in Paris was originally scheduled to take place on 28 March 2024.)	Paris	France	Zénith Paris (Note: The venue for the Paris show on 12 October 2026, is upgraded from Cabaret Sauvage.)	Rescheduled due to injury
13 October 2026 (Note: The concert on 13 October 2026 at AFAS Live in Amsterdam was originally scheduled to take place on 30 March 2024.)	Amsterdam	Netherlands	AFAS Live (Note: The venue for the Amsterdam show on 13 October 2026, is upgraded from Melkweg.)	Rescheduled due to injury
15 October 2026 (Note: The concert on 15 October 2026 at O_{2} Academy Brixton was originally scheduled to take place on 1 April 2024.)	London	England	O_{2} Academy Brixton (Note: The venue for the London show on 15 October 2026, is upgraded from KOKO.)	Rescheduled due to injury
27 October 2026 (Note: The concert on 27 October 2026 at Uber Eats Music Hall in Berlin was originally scheduled to take place on 25 March 2024.)	Berlin	Germany	Uber Eats Music Hall (Note: The venue for the Berlin show on 27 October 2026, is upgraded from Säälchen.)	Rescheduled due to injury
29 October 2026 (Note: The concert on 29 October 2026 at Annexet in Stockholm was originally scheduled to take place on 22 March 2024.)	Stockholm	Sweden	Annexet (Note: The venue for the Stockholm show on 29 October 2026, is upgraded from Nalen.)	Rescheduled due to injury
30 October 2026 (Note: The concert on 30 October 2026 at Oslo Spektrum in Oslo was originally scheduled to take place on 21 March 2024.)	Oslo	Norway	Oslo Spektrum (Note: The venue for the Oslo show on 30 October 2026, is upgraded from Parkteatret.)	Rescheduled due to injury
1 November 2026 (Note: The concert on 1 November 2026 at K.B. Hallen in Copenhagen was originally scheduled to take place on 24 March 2024.)	Copenhagen	Denmark	K.B. Hallen (Note: The venue for the Copenhagen show on 1 November 2026, is upgraded from Amager Bio.)	Rescheduled due to injury
