= Memories (LoJay song) =

2025 single by Lojay featuring Tyla

Single by Lojay featuring Tyla

from the album XOXO
- Released: 24 October 2025
- Genre: Afrobeats; R&B; Alt R&B
- Length: 3:17
- Label: Koratori Music
- Songwriters: Olekan Osefeso; Tyla Laura Seethal; Sarz
- Composers: Leandro Dro Hildago; David Ratomi
- Producers: Sarz; Twitch 4eva; Irewemnu Michael

Lojay singles chronology
"Sensational" (2024)	"Memories" (2025)

Tyla singles chronology
"Body Go" (2025)	"Memories" (2025)	"Chanel" (2025)

Music video
- "Memories" on YouTube

Memories is a single by Nigerian singer and songwriter Lojay featuring South African singer Tyla. The song was released as the fifth single to Lojay's debut studio album XOXO.

== Background ==
The song was teased as unreleased track from Lojay's TikTok account in late August and quickly started gaining traction. The leaked version song highly focused on Tyla's verse with the media going crazy for its release. Weeks later Lojay revealed he will be dropping his debut sophomore studio album XOXO. He went on to confirm that "Memories" will be included as a single and will be released as the same day as the album.

== Personnel ==
Credits adapted from Spotify.

- Olekan Osefeso – singer, songwriter
- Tyla Seethal – singer, songwriter
- Osabuohien Osaretin – songwriter, producer
- Irewumni Michael – songwriter, producer
- Twitch 4eva – producer
- Leanadro "Dro" Hildago –producer, sound engineer
- David Ratomi – sound engineer

== Charts ==
Chart performance for "Memories"
Chart (2025)	Peak position
Nigeria (TurnTable Top 100)	93
South Africa Streaming (TOSAC)	95
