= Tyla (album) =

- Standard cover

Studio album by Tyla
- Released: 22 March 2024
- Recorded: 2021–2024
- Studios: Miloco (London); ACP (Cape Town); Criteria (Miami); SessionsAtlanta (Atlanta); Sarm (London); Geejam (Port Antonio); Just for the Record (Los Angeles); Home Away From Home (Los Angeles); Sony (Los Angeles)
- Genres: Amapiano; pop; R&B
- Length: 38:29
- Labels: FAX; Epic
- Producers: Sammy Soso; Believve; Rayan El-Hussein Goufar; Alex Lustig; Sir Nolan; P2J; Manana; Christer; LuuDadeejay; Kelvin Momo

Tyla chronology
Tyla (2024)	WWP (2025)

Singles from Tyla
- 1. "Water" Released: 28 July 2023; 2. "Truth or Dare" Released: 13 February 2024; 3. "Art" Released: 12 April 2024; 4. "Jump" Released: 14 May 2024

Tyla +
- Deluxe edition cover

Singles from Tyla +
- 1. "Push 2 Start" Released: 25 October 2024

Tyla (stylised in all caps) is the debut studio album by South African singer Tyla. It was released on 22 March 2024 through FAX and Epic Records. The album blends amapiano, pop, Afrobeats and R&B in its production, and lyrically focuses on empowerment and relationships. It features guest appearances from Kelvin Momo, Tems, Becky G, Skillibeng, Gunna and Travis Scott.

Recording sessions spanned two and a half years across seven countries, and Tyla worked alongside collaborators including Ari PenSmith, Mocha Bands, Believve and Sammy Soso to write and product the record. The lead single from the album, "Water", marked Tyla's international breakthrough; it peaked at number 7 on the U.S. Billboard Hot 100 and earned multi-platinum certifications in several countries. Other singles from the album included "Truth or Dare", "Art" and "Jump".

The album was released in the UK by Since '93 and RCA Records. CD and vinyl formats were distributed in South Africa by Sony Music South Africa and in the U.S. by Epic Records. A Japanese edition was released on 7 August 2024 by Sony Music Entertainment Japan. Tyla promoted the album through pop-up shows and live performances in countries including the UK and Japan. A deluxe edition, titled Tyla +, was released on 11 October 2024.

Tyla received critical acclaim from critics, who praised Tyla's versatility and the album's blending of multiple genres. It debuted at number 24 on the U.S. Billboard 200, amassing 24,000 album-equivalent units in its first week. It reached number one in Tunisia and Papua New Guinea and charted within the top 20 in the UK, the Netherlands, Norway, New Zealand and Switzerland. The album won Newcomer of the Year, Best Pop Album and Female Artist of the Year at the 30th Annual South African Music Awards. It was certified gold and higher in multiple territories. In support of the album, Tyla announced the Tyla Tour but had to cancel and reschedule some shows due to injuries.

== Background and release ==
Shortly after graduating high school in 2019, Tyla released her debut single, "Getting Late". She directed the music video and promoted it through social media. The video gained significant traction in South Africa, amassing over 930,000 YouTube views within a month and catching the attention of Epic Records executives. In 2021, Tyla signed a recording contract with Epic and traveled outside South Africa for the first time to attend a songwriting camp in Dubai organised by the label. Over the next two and a half years, she participated in recording sessions across South Africa, Ghana, Tanzania, Jamaica, Nigeria, the United States, and the United Kingdom to gain professional studio experience and develop her debut album. (Note: On 28 March 2024, Tyla told Billboard that she spent two-and-a-half years recording the album. On 17 October 2024, in a dialog with Lisa of Blackpink on Musicians on Musicians for Rolling Stone, she said that she started working on the album over three years ago.) During this period, she collaborated with producers and songwriters Sammy Soso, Ari PenSmith, Believve, and Mocha Bands, who contributed significantly to the album's production and songwriting.

In October 2023, Tyla told Capital Xtra that she had been working on her debut album for over two years and described its genre as "popiano", a term she coined to blend amapiano and pop music. She explained to Billboard that she fused Western genres with African influences, aiming to create a concise three-minute format typical of R&B or pop songs, as opposed to the eight-to-ten-minute length of traditional amapiano tracks. In March 2024, Tyla shared with Rolling Stone that she named her album to introduce her unique musical style to new listeners. She noted that the title reflects the extensive effort she invested over time, countering misconceptions about her rapid rise to fame. She described the album as "experimental". Tyla was recorded at Geejam Studios in Port Antonio, Miloco and Sarm Studios in London, ACP Studios in Cape Town, SessionsAtlanta Studios in Atlanta, Criteria Studios in Miami, and Home Away From Home, Just for the Road, and Sony Music Studios in Los Angeles.

Tyla announced the album's release date via social media on 30 November 2023. Originally scheduled for 1 March 2024, the release was delayed to include a collaboration with Nigerian singer Tems on the song "No.1". The album was ultimately released on 22 March 2024, through FAX Records and Epic Records. It was released by Since '93 and RCA Records in the UK, CD and vinyl formats were released in South Africa by Sony Music South Africa and in the U.S. exclusively through Target by Epic Records. The Japanese edition was released on 7 August 2024, by Sony Music Entertainment Japan. During an interview with Elle on 10 September 2024, Tyla hinted a deluxe edition of her album. Titled Tyla +, it was released on 11 October 2024, with three additional tracks.

== Composition and themes ==
Tyla is an amapiano, pop, and R&B record that contains elements of Afrobeats, a sound Tyla calls "popiano". The 41-second-long opening track, "Intro", consisting of a recording that plays in the background while people converse, was produced by South African record producer Kelvin Momo. In an interview with Nandi Madida on Africa Now Radio with Nandi Madida for Apple Music, she stated that she wanted to kick off the album with a raw and proudly South African sound.

"Safer" is melodic track with syncopated log drum and chants as an expansion. "Water" is a pop and R&B-infused amapiano song. "Water" was described as a song about a woman's longing to feel a "squirting orgasm". On the pre-chorus, Tyla sings, "can you blow my mind? Set off my whole body?" Explaining the lyrics with Genius, she said it is about telling a guy to show her what he has to offer. The fourth song on the album, "Truth or Dare", is an amapiano recording, which has been described as a slab of Afrobeats by Joshua Minsoo Kim of Resident Advisor. It is an R&B-infused track, characterised by guitar riffs, Tyla's "candied" vocals, as well as rhythmic and bass-heavy percussion. In the chorus, she sings about remembering when her then-lover would mistreat her and dares him to catch up. The seventh song on the album, "Butterflies", is a fusion of hip hop, pop and R&B that is similar to the musical style of the American singer Ariana Grande. Throughout the verses and hook of "Breathe Me," her voice is forceful, but she softens on the phrase "breathe me" to emphasise the song's concept. "No.1" contains vocals from Tems that balances Tyla's lighter vocals. Lucas Martins of Beats Per Minute described the vocal delivery as unsubtly Aaliyah-inspired performances.

"On and On" blends "old-school" R&B, amapiano and pop. On "Jump", Tyla sings: "they ain't never had a pretty girl from Jo'burg, see me now and that's what they prefer". Including vocals from Gunna and Skillibeng, it was described as "the most trap-adjacent production" on the album by Lucas Martins of Beats Per Minute. "Jump" is a fusion of Afrobeats, dancehall and hip hop with echoing log drums and percussion that define the amapiano genre. Airhorns are introduced in the chorus, along with the party chant, "haibo!", a Zulu language expression for shock or disbelief. "Jump" opens with an intro by Skillibeng, who compliments Tyla and calls her "an original gyal". She sings the first verse with braggadocio and the single-syllable chorus in a rap-sung cadence. In the second verse, Gunna promises to fulfil Tyla's desires and buy her jewellery. The song ends with an outro by Skillibeng. "Art", the tenth song on the album, has been described as "the most erotic song Tyla has released since 'Water'" by Joshua Minsoo Kim of Resident Advisor. Martins of Beats Per Minute wrote that "Art" showcases Tyla's most subtle vocal performance and smooth ad-libs, as she expresses her desire to become a work of art for her love interest. It is followed by "On My Body", a deep house-influenced recording featuring vocals partially sung in Spanish by Becky G. On the song "Priorities", she illustrates her figurative message of spreading herself too thin over a ghostly highlife guitar. The thirteenth song on the album, "To Last" is a fusion of R&B and amapiano track that features Tyla's smooth, whispered vocals and synths with an aspect of sadness as she sings: "You never gave us a chance, it's like you never wanted us to last". The album closes with a remix of "Water", with Auto-Tuned vocals from Travis Scott.

== Promotion ==
On 5 December 2023, Tyla announced her debut concert tour, the Tyla Tour, scheduled to begin on 21 March 2024 in Oslo and conclude on 28 May 2024 in Minneapolis. On 7 March 2024, Tyla announced via social media the cancellation of the North American leg of the tour due to an undisclosed injury sustained before the tour began. The UK and European legs were postponed and rescheduled. Following the release of her album, Tyla hosted meet-and-greet events to promote it, including one in Shoreditch, England, on 27 March 2024, and another at Mall of Africa in Johannesburg, South Africa, on 2 April 2024. She also held meet-and-greet events in Tokyo, Japan, on 18 August 2024, and in Seoul, South Korea, on 26 August 2024.

== Live performances ==
Tyla first performed "Water" in June 2023 at Afro Nation Portugal. (Note: Source(s) does not go into detail on whether the song was unreleased or not during the Afro Nation festival. This source states that the event was held on 29 June 2023, Billboard says otherwise.) She also performed "Water" on 2 August, and "To Last" on 6 September 2023 for Vevo's programme DSCVR. That October, she made her global television debut performing "Water" on The Bianca Show in Sweden. She also performed the song on the US television show, The Tonight Show Starring Jimmy Fallon later that month. On 30 November 2023, she performed "On and On" on ColorsxStudios. Tyla performed an unreleased remix version of "Water" with South African DJ Black Coffee at a nightclub in Sandton on 6 December. She performed a medley of "Water" and "Truth or Dare" on the season 24 finale of the US television series The Voice aired on NBC on 18 December. She also performed a medley of "On and On", "Truth or Dare" and "Water" in Times Square during the 2024 television special Dick Clark's New Year's Rockin' Eve. On 9 April 2024, she performed "Art" on the US late-night talk show The Late Show With Stephen Colbert.

Tyla performed "Jump" alongside Gunna and Skillibeng at the 24th BET Awards in Los Angeles, California on 30 June 2024, after receiving the BET Award for Best New Artist. She then attended the Prelude to the 2024 Olympic Games at the Foundation Louis Vuitton in Paris on 25 July 2024, dressed in black velvet Louis Vuitton tracksuits. There, she delivered a medley of "Thata Ahh", "Jump" and "Water", dressed in an oversized Louis Vuitton jersey and spandex shorts. On 4 August, she performed "Water" at the 17th edition of Osheaga Festival in Montreal, Canada. Tyla was 30 minutes late for her set at the Outside Lands festival in San Francisco, California, on 9 August, where she delivered a 20-minute performance of "Truth or Dare", "Water" and "Safer". She performed most of the tracks from the record including "Breathe Me" and "Water", as well as cover songs at the 2024 edition of Summer Sonic Festival in Osaka, Japan, on 17 August 2024. The following day in Tokyo, she delivered a 45-minute performance where she opened with "Safer", followed by "On My Body", which she sang with Becky G. There, she also performed her non-album singles "Thata Ahh" and "Ke Shy", the latter by Major Lazer and Major League DJz, before performing a mash-up of Aaliyah's "Rock the Boat" and her "On and On", followed by "Art", "No.1" and "Truth or Dare", as she went on to perform another non-album single "Bana Ba", then "Breathe Me" and "Jump" before closing with "Water". From 23 to 25 August 2024, she performed some of her songs including "Water" at the LaLaLa Festival in Jakarta, Indonesia, and she then performed at the One Universe Festival in Seoul, South Korea on 28 August 2024, where she opened with the South African national anthem, "Nkosi Sikelel' iAfrika" and again on 20 September, in Rio de Janeiro, Brazil at the Rock in Rio festival held at the Parque Olimpico. Tyla performed a medley of "Water" and "Push 2 Start" in Brooklyn Navy Yard, New York City on 15 October 2024, at the 2024 Victoria's Secret Fashion Show and again in Co-op Live, Manchester, United Kingdom on 10 November, at the 2024 MTV Europe Music Awards. She hosted a two-city concert in South Africa, one at the Grand Arena in Cape Town on 5 December 2024 and another at the SunBet Arena in Pretoria on 7 December. Hours after her show in Pretoria, she announced that she would be returning for another event on 18 January 2025. In partnership with Absa Group and YFM, the event took place at the SunBet Arena and it was live streamed on Showmax to viewers across 44 countries.

== Singles ==
"To Last" was Tyla's major label debut, which premiered on BBC Radio 1Xtra on 4 November 2022. "To Last" was later included on Tyla. The album's lead single "Water" was released on 28 July 2023. It reached number seven on the Billboard Hot 100 chart and peaked within the top 10 in multiple countries. The song earned her many accolades, including the inaugural Best African Music Performance at the 66th Annual Grammy Awards. "Water" received multiple certifications in many countries including the United States Brazil and South Africa. Two remix versions of "Water", one with Travis Scott and the other with Marshmello, were released on 17 November 2023. "Water" was covered by multiple musicians including Leona Lewis, Trevor Jackson and Cosmo's Midnight.

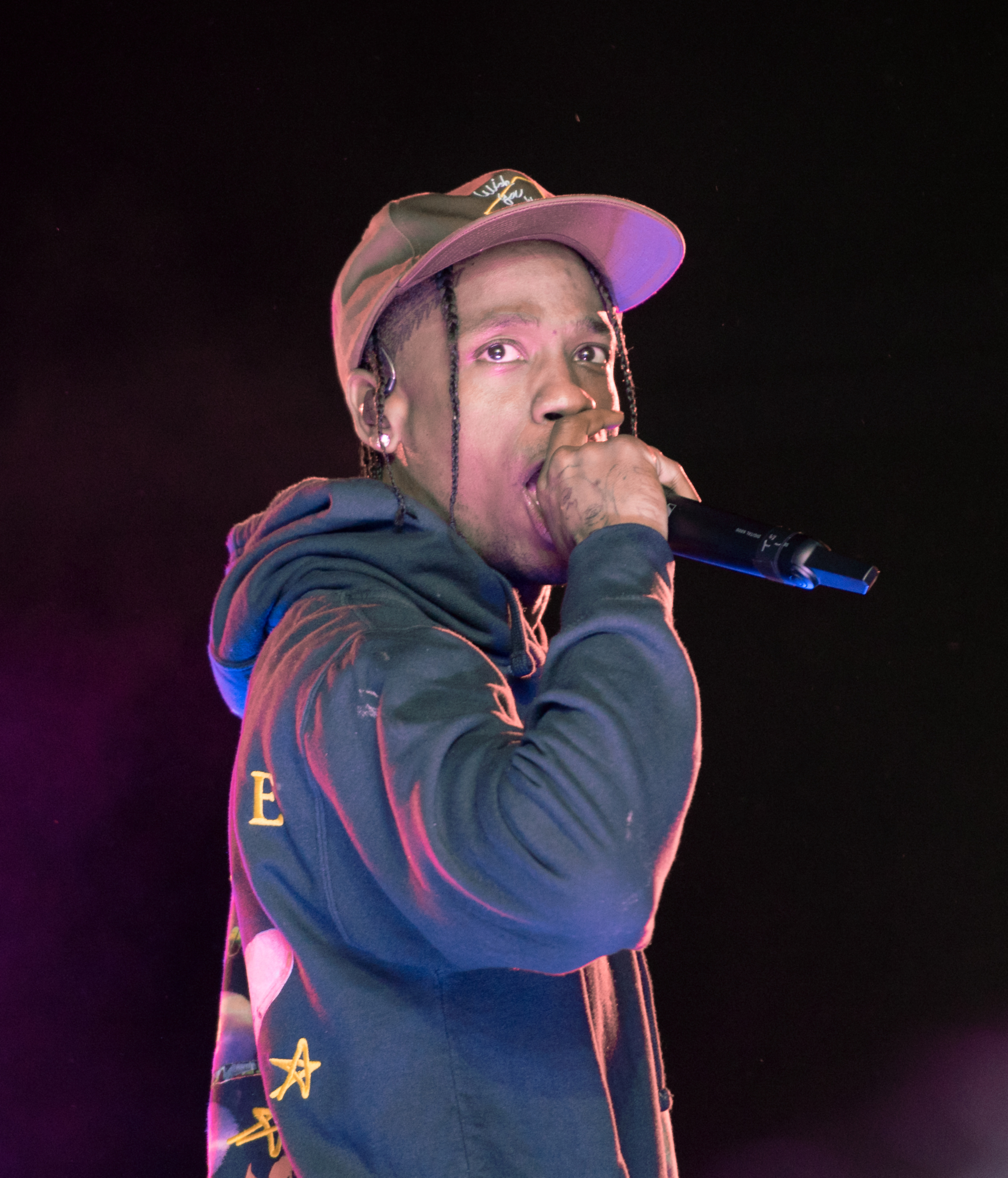
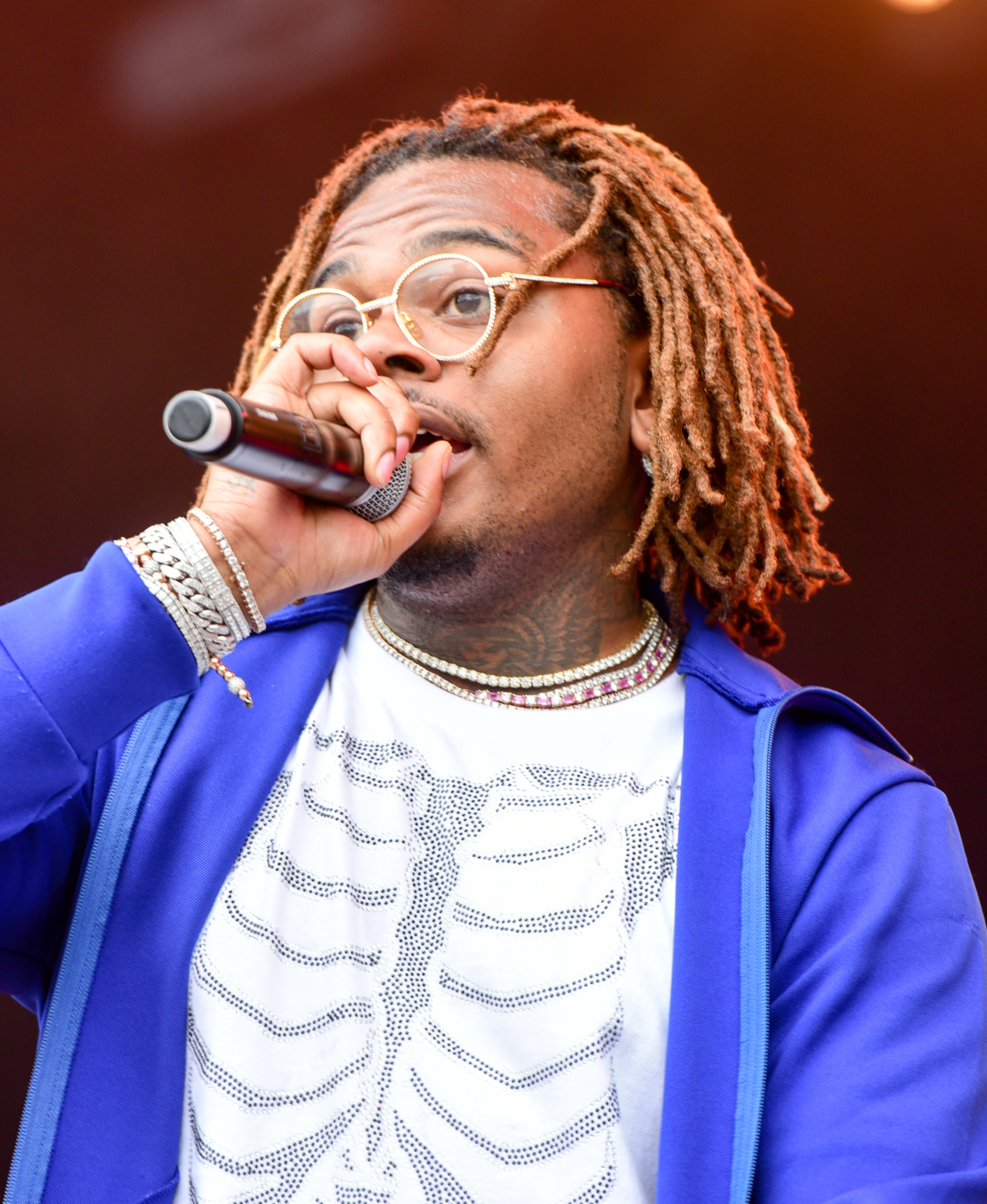
Two of the featured artists on the album were Travis Scott (left) and Gunna (right)

"Truth or Dare" was serviced to rhythmic contemporary radio stations on 13 February 2024. It peaked at number 4 on the Bubbling Under Hot 100 chart and number 17 on the Rhythmic chart. "Truth or Dare" was certified gold in Brazil and Canada. It was also covered by South Korean singer, Somin of Kard. A live performance of "On and On" on the German music-performance platform ColorsxStudios was released on YouTube and other digital-streaming platforms a day before the release of the digital extended play (EP) Tyla.

"Art" was accompanied by a music video on the day of the album release. A teaser video, which Tyla shared on social media accounts on 13 March 2024, depicts her and Lisa of Blackpink previewing the song. "Art" was sent to Italian radio as a single. "Jump" was serviced to rhythmic contemporary radio on 14 May 2024, and to radio airplay in Italy on 7 June 2024. "Jump" peaked at number 87 in Canada, where it was certified gold by Music Canada. A music video for the fifth single, "Breathe Me", premiered on YouTube on 3 September 2024. (Note: There was no record of radio date. However, Rolling Stone referred to the track as the fifth single off the album, while RTTNews and The Source called it "the latest single from the album".) "Push 2 Start" was released in tandem with the deluxe edition of the album on 11 October 2024. It was sent to BBC Radio 1Xtra in the United Kingdom on 18 October, and Italian radio stations on 25 October. "Push 2 Start" was serviced to rhythmic crossover on 29 October, where it was the most added track of that week with 38 stations.

== Critical reception ==
Professional ratings
Aggregate scores
Source	Rating
AnyDecentMusic?	7.7/10
Metacritic	84/100
Review scores
Source	Rating
AllMusic	4/5 stars
Beats Per Minute	75/100
Clash	8/10
HipHopDX	4/5
i	4/5 stars
The Line of Best Fit	9/10
The Native	7.4/10
NME	4/5 stars
Pitchfork	8.0/10
Pulse	7/10

Tyla received "universal critical" acclaim from contemporary critics, most of whom commented on Tyla's ability to fuse a variety of musical styles such as afrobeats, amapiano, pop and R&B while remaining "true to her roots".

Writing for African Folder, Bomi Anifowose said the album's distinction "reflects the meticulous effort poured into its crafting". He noted Tyla "refused to settle for mediocrity" and that she "poured her heart and energy" into each aspect of the album. Concluding the review, Anifowose stated: "there is no skippable song" on the album and called it "one of the most groundbreaking debuts" from an African pop star. Beats Per Minute's Lucas Martins complimented the album's versatility, noting it "presents restrained yet club-ready songs" that make for the "perfect vibe". Concluding his review, Martins wrote the "expertly crafted record"'s authentic sound will allow Tyla to become a star. Writing for Clash, Robin Murray said Tyla "opens with a flurry of highlights" and that "she's able to remain true to her roots". He also said the album "taps into the emerging energies of spring" and described it as "one of 2024's most insistent projects".

According to Tai Saint-Louis of HipHopDX, the album proves Tyla has the potential to become "one of the genre-defining stars of her generation", saying "she comes off as organically comfortable". i's Ed Power wrote Tyla stays on "the front foot" on an album where "forward motion is a recurring metaphor". Writing for The Line of Best Fit, Amaya Lim said Tylas's unique selling point is that "she has all the trappings of a real Popstar". Lim noted amapiano, afrobeats, pop and R&B are "expertly blended into every song", which results in "a record that is above all cohesive". Lim also said despite the "little emotional or energetic dynamism" on the album, it is "club-ready, danceable and infectious", attracting the masses. According to Miya Madzada of The Native, Tyla "remained genuine and authentic to herself" throughout the album and said "her charismatic personality shines out". Madzada stated Tyla "engraves her artistic" ambitions. Kayleigh Watson of NME said Tyla proves her status as "South Africa's brightest new star".

Pitchfork's Julianne Escobedo Shepherd began her review noting that on the album, Tyla "flexes her fidelity to pop-R&B" and that it "pulses with amapiano's log-drum heartbeat". She describes her singing ability as "savvy" and states that her "vocal intimacy betrays her influences". Writing for Rolling Stone, Will Hermes wrote that the album "coasts safely on its vibes" and that her debut "shows she's up to the challenge", labelling her the most "effective ambassador" for amapiano.

== Commercial performance ==
In the US, Tyla debuted at number 24 on the Billboard 200 chart, earning 24,000 album-equivalent units, including 3,100 pure sales, in its first week, becoming the highest-charting album on the Billboard 200 chart by a female African soloist in the chart's history. It accumulated over 630,6 million streams on Spotify, breaking a record previously held by Nigerian singer Burna Boy in under a week. It debuted atop the Billboard US World Albums chart, joining Nigerian singers, Wizkid and Burna Boy as the only African artists to reach that milestone, number 8 on Top R&B/Hip-Hop Albums chart and opened at number 2 on the Top R&B Albums marking the second top-two debut of 2024 after Usher's Coming Home, which debuted at number 1 in February.

The album reached number 26 in Canada, peaked at number 1 in Tunisia and Papua New Guinea, and amassed 1 billion streams on Spotify in June 2024, roughly 3 months after its release. In the United Kingdom, Tyla entered the UK Albums chart at number 19 and debuted atop the UK R&B Albums on the chart dating 4 April 2024. It peaked within the top 25 in several countries including New Zealand at number 16, the Netherlands and number 11, Norway at number 19, Switzerland at number 12. In December 2024, it was named the most streamed album by a black female musician on Spotify with 1,565 billion streams. Epic Records' CEO Sylvia Rhone and president Ezekiel Lewis presented Tyla with a commemorative plaque in Los Angeles for her achievements.

Based on sales and streaming figures, the album was certified platinum in Brazil by Pro-Música Brasil, platinum in Canada by Music Canada, platinum in New Zealand by the Recorded Music New Zealand, gold in the United States by the Recording Industry Association of America, and silver in the United Kingdom by the British Phonographic Industry, gold in South Africa, platinum in Indonesia and the Philippines, and double platinum in Thailand.

== Accolades ==
Tyla was initially submitted for the Best R&B Album at the 67th Annual Grammy Awards, but was reassigned to the Best Pop Vocal Album by the Recording Academy. The Hollywood Reporter noted that "it was a shock to see an album rooting for Afrobeats, R&B and amapiano pushed to pop instead of the Best Progressive R&B Album category which highlights R&B albums infused with other sounds". The nominations were announced on 8 November 2024, and Tyla received none. Vibe wrote that "her exclusion from Global, African Music or general categories was surprising".

=== Awards and nominations ===
Award	Year (Note: Indicates the year of ceremony. Each year is linked to the article about the awards held that year, wherever possible.)	Category	Result	Ref.
Billboard Music Awards	2024	Top R&B Album	Nominated	
South African Music Awards	2024	Album of the Year	Nominated	
South African Music Awards	2024	Best Pop Album	Won	
South African Music Awards	2024	Female Artist of the Year	Won	
South African Music Awards	2024	Newcomer of the Year	Won	
Urban Music Awards	2025	Best Album	Nominated	

=== Year-end lists ===
Select rankings of Tyla
Publication	List	Rank	Ref.
AllMusic	Best Albums of 2024	—N/a	
Billboard	The 50 Best Albums of 2024	13	
Business Insider	The best albums of 2024	6	
Consequence	30 Best Albums of 2024 (So Far)	19	
Complex	The 50 Best Albums of 2024	37	
The New York Times	Best Albums of 2024	—N/a	
NME	The best albums of 2024... so far!	19	
NPR	The 50 Best Albums of 2024	—N/a	
Resident Advisor	The Best Records of 2024	16	
Rolling Stone	The 100 Best Albums of 2024	6	
Sunday World	The ten best albums of 2024 so far	10	
Uproxx	The Best Albums Of 2024	—N/a	
Variety	The Best 20 Albums of 2024 (So Far)	19	
Variety	The Best Albums of 2024 (Note: Thania Garcia's Top 10.)	8	
Vogue	The Best Albums of 2024 (So Far)	—N/a	

== Track listing ==
Tyla track listing
No.	Title	Writer(s)	Producer(s)	Length
1.	"Intro" (with Kelvin Momo)	Tyla Seethal; Kelvin Momo; Mbali Kanyisile Makanya	Momo	0:41
2.	"Safer"	Seethal; Ariowa Irosogie; Imani Lewis; Corey Marlon Lindsay-Keay; Samuel Awuku; Tricky Stewart; Chaniva Francis	Sammy SoSo^{[a]}; Ceebeaats^{[b]}; Ari PenSmith^{[c]}; Mocha^{[c]}; Believve^{[c]}	2:39
3.	"Water"	Seethal; Irosogie; Lewis; Lindsay-Keay; Awuku; Rayan El-Hussein Goufar; Olmo Zucca; Jackson Paul Lomastro; Stewart	SoSo^{[a]}; Goufar^{[b]}; Believve^{[c]}; Ebenezer Maxwell^{[c]}	3:20
4.	"Truth or Dare"	Seethal; Irosogie; Lewis; Lindsay-Keay; Awuku; Jamal Europe	SoSo^{[a]}; Believve^{[d]}; PenSmith^{[c]}; Mocha^{[c]}	3:10
5.	"No.1" (featuring Tems)	Seethal; Irosogie; Temilade Openiyi; Awuku; Alexander Lustig; Joel Mason Tanner	Lustig; SoSo^{[a]}; PenSmith^{[c]}; Oscar Cornejo^{[c]}; Tyla^{[c]}; Tems^{[c]}	2:27
6.	"Breathe Me"	Seethal; Irosogie; Lewis; Lindsay-Keay; Awuku; Goufar; Europe	SoSo^{[a]}; Goufar; PenSmith^{[c]}; Mocha^{[c]}; Believve^{[c]}	3:21
7.	"Butterflies"	Seethal; Nolan Lambroza; Irosogie; Marcus Semaj	Sir Nolan	2:42
8.	"On and On"	Seethal; Lindsay-Keay	Believve^{[a]}; Maxwell^{[e]}	2:47
9.	"Jump" (with Gunna and Skillibeng)	Seethal; Irosogie; Lewis; Lindsay-Keay; Awuku; Sergio Kitchens; Emwah Warmington	SoSo^{[a]}; PenSmith^{[c]}; Mocha^{[c]}; Believve^{[c]}	2:27
10.	"Art"	Seethal; Irosogie; Lewis; Lindsay-Keay; Awuku; James Mwanza	SoSo^{[a]}; PenSmith^{[c]}; Mocha^{[c]}; Believve^{[c]}; Cornejo^{[c]}	2:29
11.	"On My Body" (with Becky G)	Seethal; Irosogie; Lewis; Lindsay-Keay; Awuku; Amia Brave; Rebbeca Marie Gomez; Richard Isong; Akil King; Sarah Schell	SoSo^{[a]}; P2J; PenSmith^{[c]}; Mocha^{[c]}; Believve^{[c]}; Cornejo^{[c]}	2:55
12.	"Priorities"	Seethal; Irosogie; Lewis; Lindsay-Keay; Awuku; Gaetan Judd	SoSo^{[a]}; PenSmith^{[c]}; Mocha^{[c]}; Believve^{[c]}; Cornejo^{[c]}	3:15
13.	"To Last"	Seethal; Luyanda Ngcatsha; Christer Kobedi; Ndumiso Manana	Manana; Christer; LuuDadeejay; Cornejo^{[c]}	2:56
14.	"Water" (remix with Travis Scott)	Seethal; Irosogie; Lewis; Lindsay-Keay; Jacques Webster; Douglas Ford; Awuku; Goufar; Zucca; Lomastro; Stewart	SoSo	3:20
Total length:				38:29

Japanese edition bonus track
No.	Title	Writer(s)	Producer(s)	Length
15.	"Water" (remix with Marshmello)	Seethal; Irosogie; Lewis; Lindsay-Keay; Awuku; Goufar; Zucca; Lomastro; Stewart	Marshmello	3:11
Total length:				41:40

Tyla LP track listing
No.	Title	Writer(s)	Producer(s)	Length
13.	"Water" (remix with Marshmello)	Seethal; Irosogie; Lewis; Lindsay-Keay; Awuku; Goufar; Zucca; Lomastro; Stewart	Marshmello	3:11
14.	"Water" (remix with Travis Scott)	Seethal; Irosogie; Lewis; Lindsay-Keay; Webster; Douglas Ford; Awuku; Goufar; Zucca; Lomastro; Stewart	SoSo	3:20
Total length:				38:44

Tyla + track listing
No.	Title	Writer(s)	Producer(s)	Length
1.	"Shake Ah" (featuring Tony Duardo, Optimist ZA and Ez Maestro)	Tyla Seethal; Kutlwano Mokgola; Namhla Lukhona Moletsane; Phenyo Tshiamo Benedict Tsebe; Thabo Musa	Tony Duardo; Buddy Kay; M00tion	5:49
2.	"Push 2 Start"	Ariowa Irosogie; Mocha; Believve; Sjo; Tyla Seethal; Imani Lewis; Corey Marlon Lindsay-Keay	Rayo; Mocha; Ari PenSmith; Believve^{[c]}; Sammy SoSo^{[c]}; Ebenezer Maxwell^{[c]}	2:36
3.	"Back to You"	Seethal; Dayo Olatunji; Jahaan Akil Sweet; James Essien; Peace Oredope; Amanda "Kiddo A.I" Ibanez	P.Priime; Jahaan Sweet	2:35
Total length:				49:29

Notes

- ^{^[a]} signifies a primary producer and vocal producer.
- ^{^[b]} signifies a co-producer.
- ^{^[c]} signifies a vocal producer.
- ^{^[d]} signifies a co-producer and vocal producer.
- ^{^[e]} signifies an additional vocal producer.
- Tracks 4 to 17 of Tyla + reflect the tracklist of the standard edition.

== Personnel ==
Credits are adapted from the liner notes.

Recording

- Geejam Studios – Port Antonio, Jamaica
- Miloco Studios – London, England
- Sarm Studios – London, England
- ACP Studios – Cape Town, South Africa
- SessionsAtlanta Studios – Atlanta, United States
- Criteria Studios – Miami, United States
- Home Away From Home Studios – London, England
- Just for the Road Studios – Los Angeles, United States
- Sony Music Studios – Los Angeles, United States

Musicians

- Tyla – lead vocals (all tracks), background vocals (tracks 5, 7–12)
- Kelvin Momo – vocals (track 1)
- Sammy SoSo – bass, programming (tracks 3, 14); background vocals (9–11)
- Jack LoMastro – keyboards (track 3)
- Olmo Zucca – guitar (track 3)
- Adenine Zen – choir (track 4)
- Greg Dwight – choir (track 4)
- Ivie Ideh – choir (track 4)
- Mari Songs – choir (track 4)
- PJ Greaves – choir (track 4)
- Paula – choir (track 4)
- Shanice Steele – choir (track 4)
- Sincerely Wilson – choir (track 4)
- Ari PenSmith – background vocals (tracks 5, 7, 9–12)
- Tems – lead vocals, background vocals (track 5)
- Jamal Europe – guitar (track 6)
- Nadia – violin (track 6)
- Believve – background vocals (tracks 8–11)
- Mocha – background vocals (tracks 9–11)
- Gunna – lead vocals (track 9)
- Skillibeng – lead vocals (track 9)
- James Mwanza – keyboards (track 10)
- Becky G – lead vocals (track 11)
- Gaetan Judd – guitar (track 12)
- Travis Scott – lead vocals (track 14)

Technical

- Colin Leonard – mastering
- Oscar Cornejo – mixing (track 1), engineering (5, 10–14)
- Leandro "Dro" Higaldo – mixing (tracks 2–6, 8–14)
- Serge Courtois – mixing (track 7)
- Kelvin Momo – engineering (track 1)
- Richard Ledesma – engineering (tracks 2, 3, 14)
- Charlie Rolfe – engineering (tracks 2, 4, 5, 9)
- Sammy SoSo – engineering, arrangement (tracks 3, 14)
- Ebenezer Maxwell – engineering (tracks 3, 14)
- Jeremy Tomlinson – engineering (track 7)
- Sir Nolan – engineering (track 7)
- Believve – engineering, arrangement (track 8)
- Florian "Flo" Ongonga – engineering (track 9)
- Aidan Duncan – engineering assistance (tracks 2–5, 7–)
- Timothy Ishejamaica Kahwa – engineering assistance (tracks 10, 11)

== Charts ==
=== Weekly charts ===
Weekly chart performance for Tyla
Chart (2024–2026)	Peak position
Australian Albums (ARIA)	48
Australian Hip Hop/R&B Albums (ARIA)	5
Austrian Albums (Ö3 Austria)	48
Belgian Albums (Ultratop Flanders)	49
Belgian Albums (Ultratop Wallonia)	44
Canadian Albums (Billboard)	26
French Albums (SNEP)	31
Dutch Albums (Album Top 100)	11
German Albums (Offizielle Top 100)	86
Irish Albums (IRMA)	59
Japanese Digital Albums (Oricon)	36
Japanese Hot Albums (Billboard Japan)	65
Lithuanian Albums (AGATA)	36
New Zealand Albums (RMNZ)	16
Nigerian Albums (TurnTable)	25
Norwegian Albums (VG-lista)	19
Portuguese Albums (AFP)	23
Scottish Albums (Official Charts)	72
Spanish Albums (PROMUSICAE)	73
Swedish Albums (Sverigetopplistan)	57
Swiss Albums (Schweizer Hitparade)	12
UK Albums (Official Charts)	19
UK R&B Albums (Official Charts)	1
US Billboard 200	24
US Top R&B/Hip-Hop Albums (Billboard)	8
US World Albums (Billboard)	1

=== Year-end charts ===
2024 year-end chart performance for Tyla
Chart (2024)	Position
French Albums (SNEP)	198
US Top R&B/Hip-Hop Albums (Billboard)	75
US World Albums (Billboard)	8

2025 year-end chart performance for Tyla
Chart (2024)	Position
US World Albums (Billboard)	7

== Certifications ==
Certifications for Tyla
Region	Certification	Certified units/sales
Brazil (Pro-Música Brasil)	Platinum	40,000^{‡}
Canada (Music Canada)	Platinum	80,000^{‡}
Denmark (IFPI Danmark)	Gold	10,000^{‡}
France (SNEP)	Gold	50,000^{‡}
Netherlands (NVPI)	Platinum	37,200^{‡}
New Zealand (RMNZ)	Platinum	15,000^{‡}
Norway (IFPI Norway) Tyla +	Gold	10,000^{‡}
South Africa (RISA)	Platinum	50,000^{‡}
Sweden (GLF)	Gold	15,000^{‡}
Switzerland (IFPI Switzerland)	Gold	10,000^{‡}
United Kingdom (BPI)	Gold	100,000^{‡}
United States (RIAA)	Gold	500,000^{‡}
^{‡} Sales+streaming figures based on certification alone.

== Release history ==
Release dates and formats for Tyla
Region	Date	Format	Edition	Label	Ref.
Various	1 December 2023	Digital download; streaming	EP	FAX; Epic	
Various	22 March 2024	CD; digital download; streaming; vinyl	Standard	FAX; Epic	
United Kingdom	22 March 2024	CD; digital download; streaming; vinyl	Standard	Since '93; RCA	
South Africa	22 March 2024	CD; digital download; streaming; vinyl	Standard	Sony Music South Africa	
United States	22 March 2024	CD (Target exclusive); vinyl LP (Target exclusive)	Standard	Epic	
Japan	7 August 2024	CD	Japanese	Sony Music Japan	
Various	11 October 2024	Digital download; streaming	Deluxe	FAX; Epic	
Various	24 January 2025	Vinyl	Deluxe	FAX; Epic	

== See also ==
- List of 2024 albums
- List of UK R&B Albums Chart number ones of 2024
