= Dynamite (Tyla and Wizkid song) =

Single by Tyla and Wizkid

from the EP WWP
- Released: 24 July 2025
- Recorded: 2022–2025
- Label: FAX; Epic
- Songwriters: Tyla Seethal; Bibi Bourelly; Peace Oredope; Jo Caleb; Adekunle Emmanuel Oluwaseyi; Corey Marlon Lindsay-Keay; Elvis Chimezie Akujobi; Ayodeji Ibrahim Balogun
- Producer: P.Priime

Tyla singles chronology
"Is It" (2025)	"Dynamite" (2025)	"PBT" (2025)

Wizkid singles chronology
"Kai!" (2025)	"Dynamite" (2025)	"One Condition" (2025)

Music video
- "Dynamite" on YouTube

"Dynamite" is a song by South African singer Tyla and Nigerian singer Wizkid. It was released on 24 July 2025 by FAX and Epic Records, as the third single from Tyla's EP, WWP.

== Composition ==
Tyla has said in multiple interviews that she has had "Dynamite" as a demo since 2022.

== Personnel ==
Credits were adapted from Apple Music.

Musicians

- Tyla – performer, songwriter
- Wizkid – performer, songwriter
- P.Priime – producer, songwriter
- Bibi Bourelly – songwriter
- Troy Taylor – vocal producer
- Jo Caleb – additional producer, songwriter
- Adekunle Emmanuel Oluwaseyi – songwriter
- Corey Marlon Lindsay-Keay – songwriter
- Elvis Chimezie Akujobi – songwriter

Technical

- Colin Leonard – mastering engineer
- Leandro Hidalgo – mixing engineer
- Charlie Rolfe – recording engineer

== Charts ==
=== Weekly charts ===
Weekly chart performance for "Dynamite"
Chart (2025)	Peak position
Germany Urban (Deutsche Black Charts)	5
New Zealand Hot Singles (RMNZ)	18
Nicaragua Anglo Airplay (Monitor Latino)	16
Nigeria (TurnTable Top 100)	13
Romania Airplay (TopHit)	82
South Africa Streaming (TOSAC)	45
UK Afrobeats (Official Charts)	1
US Afrobeats Songs (Billboard)	2
US World Digital Song Sales (Billboard)	3

=== Monthly charts ===
Monthly chart performance for "Dynamite"
Chart (2025)	Peak position
Romania Airplay (TopHit)	97
