= Ari PenSmith =

English songwriter, producer, singer

Ariowa Ogheneochuko Kennedy Irosogie
- Born: 1992 (age 33–34); London, England
- Other names: Ari PenSmith, Ariowa Irosogie
- Musical career
- Genres: R&B; afrobeat; pop; hip-hop; afropop
- Occupations: Songwriter; producer; singer
- Label: The Flight Club / Warner Chappell Music

Ariowa Irosogie, also known as Ari PenSmith, is an English songwriter, producer and singer best known for his writing collaborations with afrobeat producer P2J, as well as his work on Beyoncé's The Lion King: The Gift & Renaissance, and rapper GoldLink's Diaspora, among others.

== Selected songwriting and production credits ==
Credits are courtesy of Discogs, Tidal, Spotify, and AllMusic.

Title	Year	Artist	Album
"Hands in the Air" (Featuring Tulisa & Ice Kid)	2013	Wiley	The Ascent
"Still Up" (Featuring Phil Adé & Jazz Cartier)	2016	Wale	Summer on Sunset
"Mirror"	2018	Mario	Dancing Shadows
"Your Choice" (Featuring Burna Boy)	2018	Lily Allen	No Shame
"Addiction"	2019	Doja Cat	Hot Pink
"Don't Jealous Me"	2019	Tekno, Lord Afrixana, Yemi Alade & Mr Eazi	The Lion King: The Gift
"Keys to the Kingdom"	2019	Tiwa Savage & Mr Eazi	The Lion King: The Gift
"Scar"	2019	070 Shake & Jessie Reyez	The Lion King: The Gift
"//error"	2019	GoldLink	Diaspora
"Zulu Screams" (Featuring Maleek Berry & Bibi Bourelly)	2019	GoldLink	Diaspora
"More" (Featuring Lola Rae)	2019	GoldLink	Diaspora
"Yard" (Featuring Haile of WSTRN)	2019	GoldLink	Diaspora
"Spanish Song" (Featuring WaveIQ)	2019	GoldLink	Diaspora
"No Lie" (Featuring Wizkid)	2019	GoldLink	Diaspora
"Swoosh"	2019	GoldLink	Diaspora
"Situationship"	2019	Snoh Aalegra	Ugh, Those Feels Again
"Wasted Energy" (Featuring Diamond Platnumz & Kaash Paige)	2020	Alicia Keys	Alicia
"Reckless"	2020	Wizkid	Made in Lagos
"Piece of Me" (Featuring Ella Mai)	2020	Wizkid	Made in Lagos
"Day Dream"	2020	NCT 127	Neo Zone: The Final Round
"That's a No No"	2020	Itzy	It'z Me
"Dying 4 Your Love"	2021	Snoh Aalegra	Temporary Highs in the Violet Skies
"Wickedest"	2021	TAMERA	Afrodite
"Angel Dust"	2021	TAMERA	Afrodite
"New Hobby"	2021	TAMERA	Afrodite
"Wild Jasmine"	2021	Joy Crookes	Skin
"Anymore" (Featuring Lucky Daye)	2021	Sinéad Harnett	Ready Is Always Too Late
"Little Giants"	2021	NAO	And Then Life Was Beautiful
"Move" (Featuring Grace Jones & Tems)	2022	Beyoncé	Renaissance
"Fallen Angel"	2022	Ella Mai	Heart on My Sleeve
"Adultsville"	2022	Bellah	Adultsville EP
"Prototype"	2022	Bellah	Adultsville EP
"Garden"	2022	Bellah	Adultsville EP
"In The Moment"	2022	Bellah	Adultsville EP
"Evil Eye (Extended)"	2022	Bellah	Adultsville EP
"Always Something"	2022	Bellah	Adultsville EP
"Something I'm Not"	2023	Rae Sremmurd	Sremm 4 Life
"Water"	2023	Tyla	Tyla
"Truth or Dare"	2023	Tyla	Tyla
"Butterflies"	2023	Tyla	Tyla
"Art"	2024	Tyla	Tyla
"When I'm With You" (Featuring Tyla)	2025	Lisa	Alter Ego
"Survival"	2025	Hope Tala	Hope Handwritten
"Damn Right" (Featuring Childish Gambino & Kali Uchis)	2025	Jennie	Ruby
"Starlight"	2025	Jennie	Ruby
"Heartbreak Avenue"	2025	Twice	This Is For

== Guest appearances ==
List of guest appearances, with other performing artists, showing year released and album name
Title	Year	Other performer(s)	Album
"Joke Ting"	2019	GoldLink	Diaspora
"Vex Oh"	2019	Kaytranada, GoldLink & Eight9FLY	Bubba
"City Girl"	2020	Jonah Christian	Non-album single

== Awards and nominations ==
Year	Ceremony	Award	Result	Ref
2023	65th Annual Grammy Awards	Grammy Award for Album of the Year (Renaissance)	Nominated	
