= Push 2 Start =

2024 single by Tyla

Single by Tyla

from the album Tyla +
- Released: 25 October 2024
- Genre: Amapiano; pop; R&B; reggae; reggaeton
- Length: 2:36
- Label: FAX; Epic
- Songwriters: Tyla Seethal; Imani Lewis; Corey Marlon Lindsay-Keay; Ariowa Isogie; Samuel Awuku; James McCarthy
- Producers: Ari PenSmith; Mocha Bands; Rayo

Tyla singles chronology
"One Call" (2024)	"Push 2 Start" (2024)	"Push 2 Start" (Remix) (2025)

Music video
- "Push 2 Start" on YouTube

Lyric video
- "Push 2 Start" on YouTube

"Push 2 Start" is a song recorded by South African singer Tyla. Released in tandem with the deluxe edition of her self-titled debut studio album by FAX and Epic Records, it was initially teased at the 2024 MTV Video Music Awards. The song was also serviced to Italian radio stations via Sony Music Italy on 25 October 2024. In the United States, the song impacted the rhythmic crossover frequencies on 29 October 2024, and it was serviced to the contemporary hit radio on 28 January 2025. Musically, the song blends elements of amapiano, pop, R&B, reggae, and a few elements from reggaeton, while using car metaphors to explore themes of commitment and attraction.

Tyla received praise from critics for her ability to merge lyrics and choreography with "Push 2 Start". She faced backlash for announcing the music video, which coincided with the 2024 U.S. presidential election. She was also praised for appointing her high school best friend as the creative director of the music video. Set in a vibrant car wash and for its 2000s vibe, the music video drew comparison to Beyoncé's "Crazy in Love" and Rihanna's "Shut Up and Drive".

"Push 2 Start" debuted at number 88 on the U.S. Billboard Hot 100, making Tyla the second female African artist to attain multiple solo entries on the chart. It peaked at number 1 on the UK Afrobeats Singles Chart and the Billboard U.S. Afrobeats Songs chart. The song was certified platinum in Brazil and New Zealand, gold in Canada, Greece and the United States and silver in the United Kingdom. Tyla performed it during her homecoming tour in South Africa. The song was covered by Chloe Bailey and the remix features guest vocals from Sean Paul. Tyla earned her first directorial credit for the remix music video. At the 2025 MTV Video Music Awards, "Push 2 Start" won the award for Best Afrobeats, marking her second win in the category.

== Background and release ==
Tyla first teased "Push 2 Start" during an interview with Entertainment Tonight at the 2024 MTV Video Music Awards on 11 September 2024, where she received the Best Afrobeats Video award for "Water". She also previewed the song ahead of its release on her social media on 8 October 2024. Written by Tyla, Corey Marlon Lindsay-Keay, Sammy SoSo, James McCarthy and its producers, Ari PenSmith and Mocha Bands, the song was released in tandem with the deluxe edition of her self-titled studio album with two other tracks on 11 October 2024, via FAX and Epic Records.

"Push 2 Start" was serviced to radio airplay in Italy by Sony Music Italy on 25 October 2024. It impacted the rhythmic crossover radio stations in the United States on 29 October 2024, before it was serviced to contemporary hit radio on 28 January 2025 by FAX and Epic Records. A mashup of "Push 2 Start" and PartyNextDoor's "For Certain" was covered by Chloe Bailey of Chloe x Halle.

== Composition ==
"Push 2 Start" is 2 minutes and 36 seconds long. It is the second track on Tyla +. Produced by Ari PenSmith, Rayo and Mocha, the song was mixed by Leandro "Dro" Hidaldo and mastered by Colin Leonard. Guitars were handled by Sjo and Olmo Zucca, keyboard by Jack LoMastro, and Sammy SoSo handled the bass and programming. It is a blend of reggae,, reggaeton, amapiano, pop and R&B genres, infused with elements of Afro pop. Tyla explores issues of commitment and attraction in the song by using analogies related to cars as she sings, "pushing on my buttons with no hesitation, gas me up give me motivation". Her smooth vocal delivery in confidence received praise from critics, whom highlited her ability to merge lyrics and choreography.

== Commercial performance ==
In the U.S., "Push 2 Start" debuted at number 4 on the Billboard U.S. Afrobeats Songs on the chart dating 26 October 2024, before dethroning "Water" to peak atop the chart on the week of 28 December 2024. It also debuted at number 16 on the Bubbling Under Hot 100 on the chart dating 28 December 2024, and went on to reach number 1 on the week of 25 January 2025. With over 400 digital downloads, 4.2 million streams and 8.3 million radio spins on the week of 27 January 2025, "Push 2 Start" debuted at number 88 on the Billboard Hot 100 chart, making Tyla the second female African artist to score multiple solo entries on the chart after South African recording artist Miriam Makeba. It also peaked at number 2 on the World Digital Song Sales chart, number 6 on the Rhythmic chart, number 23 on the Pop Airplay chart, and number 20 on the Hot R&B/Hip-Hop Songs chart.

Elsewhere, "Push 2 Start" peaked at number 70 on the Billboard Global 200. The song was certified platinum in Brazil by Pro-Música Brasil, and gold in Canada by Music Canada, for selling 40,000 units in each country. It debuted at number 5 on the Official South African Charts, and peaked at number 3 on week 4 of 2025. It also debuted atop the UK Afrobeats Singles Chart on the chart dating 20 October 2024 – 26 October 2024, peaked number 23 on the UK Singles Chart, and reached number 3 on the UK R&B Chart. The song peaked at number 70 at the Canadian Hot 100 chart, number 17 on the Philippines Hot 100 chart, and number 38 on the Dutch Single Top 100 chart. It also peaked at number 44 in Australia, number 18 in Greece, number 60 in Ireland, number 16 in the United Arab Emirates, number 20 in the New Zealand, number in 10 in Sweden, number 55 in Switzerland, and number 104 in Portugal. Its music video peaked at number 23 on the UK Video Charts. The song was certified gold in Greece by IFPI Greece for shipment of 1,000,000 units.

== Music video and live performances ==
Tyla dancing with her dancers behind a fan donning heels inspired by Rihanna; critics compared the scene to Beyoncé's video for her 2003 single "Crazy in Love".

Following the release of the deluxe edition, in November 2024, Tyla took to social media to announce that she will be releasing the music video to "Push 2 Start". The announcement coincided with the 2024 United States presidential election, leading the American fans to attack Tyla on socials, telling her to "read the room".

Directed by Aerin Moreno, the music video premiered on YouTube on 8 November 2024, at midnight (UTC+02:00). It amassed over 400,000 views in 9 hours. She was praised for bringing along her high school best friend, Thato Nzimande, as the creative director. Choreographed by Lee-ché, the video is set at a car wash where Tyla and her dancers perform a choreography near a vibrant backdrop. She later spray paints herself similar to how a car would be painted and dances on a car carrier as the video concludes. Several critics compared the visuals of the music video to the likes of Rihanna and Beyoncé, pointing out similar scenes from the music videos for their songs, "Shut Up and Drive" and "Crazy in Love" respectively, emphasizing the 2000s pop and R&B music video vibe. She also wears Rihanna-inspired heels in the video.

Tyla performed a medley of "Water" and "Push 2 Start" in Brooklyn Navy Yard, New York City on 15 October 2024, at the 2024 Victoria's Secret Fashion Show, and again in Co-op Live, Manchester, United Kingdom on 10 November, at the 30th Annual MTV Europe Music Awards. On 12 December, Tyla performed a medley of "Push 2 Start" and "Shake Ah" at the 2024 Billboard Music Awards. She performed the song during her homecoming tour in South Africa.

== Accolades ==
Awards and nominations for "Push 2 Start"
Organisation	Year	Category	Result	Ref.
MTV Video Music Awards	2025	Best Afrobeats	Won	
MTV Video Music Awards	2025	Best Choreography	Nominated	
All Africa Music Awards	2026	Song of the Year	Nominated	
All Africa Music Awards	2026	Best African Dance/Choreography	Nominated	
Grammy Awards	2026	Best African Music Performance	Won	

== Personnel ==
Credits adapted from the Apple Music and YouTube.

Musicians

- Tyla – lead vocals, background vocals, songwriter
- Sammy SoSo – background vocals, programming, bass, arranger, songwriter, vocal producer
- Ari PenSmith – background vocals, songwriter, producer
- Believve – background vocals, vocal producer
- Mocha Bands – background vocals, songwriter, producer
- Sjo – guitar
- Jack LoMastro – keyboards
- Olmo Zucca – guitar
- James McCarthy – songwriter
- Corey Marlon Lindsay-Keay – songwriter
- Ebenezer Maxwell – vocal producer
- Rayan El-Hussein Rayo Goufar – producer

Technical

- Sammy SoSo – engineer
- Maxwell Ebenezer – recording engineer
- Oscar Cornejo – recording engineer
- Aidan Duncan – assistant engineer
- Leandro "Dro" Hidalgo – mixing engineer
- Colin Leonard – mastering engineer
- Richard Ledesma – engineer

Music video

- Aerin Moreno – director
- Thato Nzimande – creative director
- Lee-Ché – choreographer
- Ronnie – stylist
- Jimmy – makeup artist
- Jayson Alexander – cameraman and editor

== Charts ==
=== Weekly charts ===
Weekly chart performance for "Push 2 Start"
Chart (2024–2025)	Peak position
Australia (ARIA)	44
Canada Hot 100 (Billboard)	70
Canada CHR/Top 40 (Billboard)	35
Croatia International Airplay (Top lista)	59
France Overseas Airplay (SNEP)	17
Global 200 (Billboard)	70
Greece International (IFPI)	18
Ireland (IRMA)	60
Lebanon (Lebanese Top 20)	8
Lithuania Airplay (TopHit)	40
Netherlands (Single Top 100)	38
New Zealand (Recorded Music NZ)	20
Nicaragua Anglo Airplay (Monitor Latino)	4
Philippines Hot 100 (Billboard Philippines)	17
Portugal (AFP)	99
Romania Airplay (TopHit)	42
South Africa Airplay (TOSAC)	1
South Africa Streaming (TOSAC)	3
Suriname (Nationale Top 40)	15
Sweden Heatseeker (Sverigetopplistan)	10
Switzerland (Schweizer Hitparade)	55
Turkey International Airplay (Radiomonitor Türkiye)	5
United Arab Emirates (IFPI)	16
UK Singles (Official Charts)	23
UK Afrobeats (Official Charts)	1
UK Hip Hop/R&B (Official Charts)	3
US Billboard Hot 100	88
US Afrobeats Songs (Billboard)	1
US Hot R&B/Hip-Hop Songs (Billboard)	20
US Pop Airplay (Billboard)	23
US Rhythmic Airplay (Billboard)	6
US World Digital Song Sales (Billboard)	2

=== Monthly charts ===
Monthly chart performance for "Push 2 Start"
Chart (2025)	Position
Lithuania Airplay (TopHit)	58
Romania Airplay (TopHit)	43

=== Year-end charts ===
Year-end chart performance for "Push 2 Start"
Chart (2025)	Position
Philippines (Philippines Hot 100)	90
US Hot R&B/Hip-Hop Songs (Billboard)	46
US Rhythmic Airplay (Billboard)	16

== Certifications ==
Certifications for "Push 2 Start"
Region	Certification	Certified units/sales
Brazil (Pro-Música Brasil)	Platinum	40,000^{‡}
Canada (Music Canada)	Gold	40,000^{‡}
France (SNEP)	Gold	100,000^{‡}
Hungary (MAHASZ)	Gold	2,000^{‡}
New Zealand (RMNZ)	Platinum	30,000^{‡}
United Kingdom (BPI)	Gold	400,000^{‡}
United States (RIAA)	Platinum	1,000,000^{‡}
Streaming
Greece (IFPI Greece)	Gold	1,000,000^{†}
^{‡} Sales+streaming figures based on certification alone.^{†} Streaming-only figures based on certification alone.

== Release history ==
Release history for "Push 2 Start"
Region	Date	Format(s)	Label(s)	Ref.
Various	11 October 2024	Digital download; streaming	FAX; Epic	
Italy	25 October 2024	Radio airplay	Sony Italy	
United States	29 October 2024	Rhythmic crossover	FAX; Epic	
United States	28 January 2025	Contemporary hit radio	FAX; Epic	

== Sean Paul remix ==
"Push 2 Start" (Remix)

Single by Tyla and Sean Paul
- Released: 14 February 2025
- Genre: Amapiano; pop; R&B; reggae; reggaeton
- Length: 2:36
- Label: FAX; Epic
- Songwriters: Tyla Seethal; Imani Lewis; Corey Marlon Lindsay-Keay; Ariowa Isogie; Samuel Awuku; James McCarthy
- Producer: Sammy SoSo

Tyla singles chronology
"Push 2 Start" (2024)	"Push 2 Start" (Remix) (2025)	"Show Me Love" (Remix) (2025)

Sean Paul singles chronology
"Let It Talk to Me" (2025)	"Push 2 Start" (Remix) (2025)	"Tek Yuh Time" (2025)

Music video
- "Push 2 Start" (Remix) on YouTube

A remix for "Push 2 Start" with Jamaican musician, Sean Paul was released on 14 February 2025. Tyla hinted the remix on her socials on 7 February 2025. The song peaked at number 30 on the Nigerian TurnTable Top 100 on the chart dating 21 February 2025, and number 28 on the New Zealand Hot Singles on the chart dating 21–27 February 2025. During an interview with The Buzz at the Essence magazine's 2025 Black Women in Hollywood event, when Tyla was asked how it was working with Paul and Skillibeng, she said "It is exciting for me. I love playing around with music and Sean Paul is an icon. You know his voice when he comes on a song. So, just being able to collab with not only him but Skillibeng, all these artists that have such unique voices and culture, I feel like it is important".

=== Music video and accolades ===
Co-directed by Tyla and Taylor Fauntleroy, the music video to the remix was published via YouTube on 3 March 2025. Tyla received her first director credits for the video. Choreographed by Lee-ché, Tyla is seen dancing in front of a backdrop, surrounded by a group of dancers similar to Paul's "I'm Still in Love with You" music video. It was nominated for the Best Music Video at the 2025 edition of the Urban Music Awards.

=== Personnel ===
Credits were adapted from Apple Music.

Musicians

- Tyla – lead vocals, background vocals, songwriter
- Sean Paul – performer
- Sammy SoSo – background vocals, songwriter, producer
- Ari PenSmith – background vocals, songwriter
- Believve – background vocals
- Mocha Bands – background vocals, songwriter
- Sjo – guitar
- Jack LoMastro – keyboards
- Olmo Zucca – guitar
- James McCarthy – songwriter
- Corey Marlon Lindsay-Keay – songwriter

Technical

- Sammy SoSo – producer
- Maxwell Ebenezer – recording engineer
- Oscar Cornejo – recording engineer
- Aidan Duncan – assistant engineer
- Leandro "Dro" Hidalgo – mixing engineer
- Colin Leonard – mastering engineer
- Charlie Rolfe – engineer

=== Charts ===
Chart performance for "Push 2 Start" (Remix)
Chart (2025–2026)	Peak position
Jamaica Airplay (JAMMS)	1
New Zealand Hot Singles (RMNZ)	28
Nicaragua Anglo Airplay (Monitor Latino)	3
Nigeria (TurnTable Top 100)	30
Nigeria Airplay (TurnTable)	12
North Macedonia Airplay (Radiomonitor)	10
South Africa Airplay (TOSAC)	1
Turkey International Airplay (Radiomonitor Türkiye)	1
