= Water (Tyla song) =

Single by Tyla

from the album Tyla
- Released: 28 July 2023
- Recorded: 2023
- Studio: SessionsAtlanta (Atlanta); ACP (Cape Town)
- Genre: Amapiano; R&B; pop
- Length: 3:20
- Label: Fax; Epic
- Composers: Tyla Seethal; Ariowa Irosogie; Imani Lewis; Corey Marlon Lindsay-Keay; Samuel Awuku; Rayan El-Hussein Goufar; Olmo Zucca; Jackson Paul Lomastro; Tricky Stewart
- Lyricists: Tyla Seethal; Ariowa Irosogie; Imani Lewis; Corey Marlon Lindsay-Keay
- Producer: Sammy SoSo

Tyla singles chronology
"Girl Next Door" (2023)	"Water" (2023)	"Truth or Dare" (2024)

Travis Scott singles chronology
"At the Party" (2023)	"Water" (remix) (2023)	"Née-Nah" (2024)

Marshmello singles chronology
"Alcohol" (2023)	"Water" (remix) (2023)	"No Man's Land" (2024)

Music videos
- "Water" on YouTube

"Water" is a song by the South African singer Tyla from her debut album, Tyla (2024). It was released on 28 July 2023 by Fax and Epic Records as the album's lead single. An amapiano song with elements of pop, R&B and Afrobeats, it sees Tyla expressing a desire for a passionate, intimate trust. Remix versions of the song by American rapper Travis Scott and record producer Marshmello were released on 17 November 2023.

"Water" was certified multi-Platinum in a number of countries, including South Africa and the United States, and was certified Diamond in Brazil by Pro-Música Brasil. The song topped Rolling Stone's list of the 40 best Afropop songs of 2023 and the Billboard Year-End U.S. Afrobeats Songs of 2024. "Water" won multiple accolades including the inaugural Grammy Award for Best African Music Performance, Billboard Music Award for Top Afrobeats Song and MTV Video Music Award for Best Afrobeats Video.

== Background and release ==
"Water" was produced by British record producer Sammy Soso. Production of the song began in London and finished in Los Angeles before it was sent to songwriters in Atlanta, who recorded a vocal demo. Tyla liked the instrumentation and recorded the song in Cape Town, South Africa. She told Interview that after finishing "Water", she was convinced that the song would be successful and dreamed about "watching [her] Spotify streams climb by the second". Before "Water" was released, Tyla successfully performed it as an opening act on the European leg of Chris Brown's Under the Influence Tour in early 2023. She first shared a snippet of the song and its accompanying dance challenge on TikTok in July 2023. Choreographed by South African dancer Lee-ché "Litchi" Janecke and inspired by the Bacardi dance style which originated in Pretoria, the dance involves shaking one's hips before pouring water down one's back in time to the song's chorus. Originally intended for a different song with a more-appropriate musical genre for this dance style, Tyla insisted to Janecke that the choreography would work with "Water" and decided to add the water-pouring to help the song go viral.

Tyla released another teaser and announced the song's release date via social media on 16 July 2023. The song was previewed on 21 July 2023 during an interview with Tyla on Spotify's Mic Check podcast series after she appeared on the streaming platform's Radar program for emerging artists. She posted its cover art on social media on 25 July, before it was released on 28 July 2023. The song gained traction on TikTok in August 2023 after a video of Tyla doing the accompanying dance during a live performance went viral. By mid-September, it began surging in streams and videos on TikTok. In the United States, it impacted rhythmic contemporary radio on 3 October, and contemporary hit radio on 24 October. The song was also played on European radio that month. Originally planned as the lead single from Tyla's debut EP, it was the first single from her debut studio album after her international breakthrough. Released on 17 November 2023, "Water" had remix versions by American rapper and labelmate Travis Scott and record producer Marshmello.

== Composition and lyrics ==
"Water" blends pop and amapiano (described by Tyla as "popiano"), with elements of R&B and afrobeats music. The song was written in 4/4 time in the key of D♯ minor, with a moderately-fast tempo of 117 beats per minute (BPM). Tyla's vocals on the track span between the low note of G♯_{3} and the high note of C♯_{5}, giving the song one octave and five tones of vocal range. It is characterised by a prominent amapiano log drum, sensuous melodies, and Tyla's "euphonious" vocals.

About the song's lyrics, Tyla described it as "kind of a naughty song" and told Rolling Stone that "the meaning of the song is frisky: it's [her] letting a guy know, 'Show me what you got to offer. I'm done with all the talk.'" She was inspired by songs which are indirect and use sexual innuendo, citing "Rock the Boat" by American singer Aaliyah as an example. Tyla uses vivid imagery to express her desire for what Neon Music described as "an all-consuming, soul-stirring connection" involving romance and sex.

== Commercial performance ==
=== North America ===
After becoming popular on the online video platform TikTok in August 2023, the hashtags #TylaWaterChallenge and #TylaWater had over 446.8 million views with over 600,000 videos in October. "Water" peaked at number 11 on the TikTok Billboard Top 50. It entered the Billboard US Afrobeats Songs chart at number 37 on 9 September 2023, topping it before debuting at number 67 on the US Billboard Hot 100 on 14 October 2023. Tyla was the youngest-ever South African and the first South African soloist in over 55 years to enter the Hot 100, following Hugh Masekela's "Grazing in the Grass" in 1968. "Water" peaked at number 7 on the chart on 13 January 2024, making Tyla the highest-charting African female soloist on the Hot 100 and surpassing Miriam Makeba's peak with "Pata Pata" (number 12 in 1968). The song reached number 4 in the Philippines and number 10 in Panama. Luminate reported that during the tracking week of 22–28 March 2024, "Water" had 10.3 million streams in the United States (a 17% increase over the preceding week's 8.8 million). In song sales and radio airplay (the final two measures influencing the Hot R&B Songs chart), "Water" had a 17-percent increase in download sales over that time and a four-percent decrease in airplay audience across all formats with 2,000 downloads sold. It topped the World Digital Song Sales, Rhythmic Airplay and Mainstream R&B/Hip-Hop Airplay charts in the United States. "Water" peaked at number 15 in Canada, where it was certified quadruple platinum by Music Canada, and was certified double platinum by the Recording Industry Association of America (RIAA) in the United States. The song was certified Gold in Mexico by the Asociación Mexicana de Productores de Fonogramas y Videogramas (AMPROFON).

=== Elsewhere ===
"Water" made its first-ever chart appearance on the Hot Singles Chart in New Zealand on 21 August 2023 (where it topped the NZ Singles Chart on 30 October), and was certified quadruple platinum by Recorded Music NZ. It entered the UK Afrobeats Singles Chart at number 13 on 9 September 2023 before debuting at number 55 on the UK Singles Chart on 21 September 2023, where it peaked at number 4 five weeks later. The song topped the Afrobeats chart and the UK R&B Chart. "Water"'s music video reached number 2 on the UK Music Video Charts, and the song was certified double platinum by the British Phonographic Industry. It peaked at number 5 in South Africa, where it was later certified quadruple platinum. "Water" was only certified triple diamond in Turkey and double platinum in India. On 19 February 2025, Tyla became the African solo artist to surpass 1 billion streams on Spotify.

== Music video ==
=== Solo version ===
The music video for "Water" premiered on YouTube on 6 October 2023, where it had three million views in three days. Filmed in New York City, the video was directed by Child. and C&P. In the video, Tyla and friends prepare for a night out at a beachside party. She performs the "Water" choreography at the party before dancing sensually with her love interest near the end of the video. Tyla told Essence that she wanted to create something that felt "hot and steamy", saying that it was the first time she had explored a love story in one of her music videos. By September 2024, the music video had over 230 million views.

=== Remix ===
The music video for the remix, featuring Travis Scott and directed by Nabil Elderkin, premiered on 18 March 2024. In the video, Tyla sings her verse as Scott stands on the opposite side of a wet, foggy glass in a shadowy place; the rapper then performs his verse standing next to Tyla.

== Controversy ==
On 11 September 2024, "Water" received the MTV Video Music Award for Best Afrobeats Video at the 2024 MTV Video Music Awards. In her acceptance speech, Tyla identified as a South African amapiano artist. Nigerian radio personality, Do2tun, took to social media and called her a hypocrite for accepting an Afrobeats accolade.

Avatar of Don Billiato

Don Billiato
(@casspernyovest)
tweeted:

No ways. Tyla won a Grammy for water bro but she don't get the Sama for record of the year at home ? Haha y'all are playing games.

2 November 2024

"Water" lost the Record of the Year award to Mthandeni SK and Lwah Ndlunkulu's "Paris" at the 30th Annual South African Music Awards. Following the conclusion of the main show on 2 November, Cassper Nyovest posted on Twitter to express his feelings on how Tyla was snubbed of the accolade. In response, Mthandeni SK implied that Nyovest, a hip hop musician, was trying to use maskandi to regain fame. In Nyovest's apology, he suggested a boxing match to address their issues.

== Live performances ==
"Water" was first performed in Portugal in June 2023 at Afro Nation Portugal, before its release. (Note: Source(s) do not go into detail about whether the song was unreleased during the Afro Nation festival. This source states that the event was held on 29 June 2023, Billboard says otherwise.) Tyla then performed "Water" in August 2023 for Vevo's DSCVR program, a video series which spotlights emerging artists. She made her international television debut in early October 2023, performing the song on The Bianca Show in Sweden and being interviewed by the host. Tyla also performed the song on The Tonight Show Starring Jimmy Fallon in the United States later that month. She performed a remix of the song with DJ Black Coffee at a Sandton nightclub in December 2023. Tyla performed the song in a medley with her follow-up single, "Truth or Dare", during the finale of season 24 of the American talent-competition show The Voice later that month. Tyla performed a medley of "On and On", "Truth or Dare", and "Water" in Times Square on the 2024 Dick Clark's New Year's Rockin' Eve television special.

She then attended the Prelude to the 2024 Olympic Games at the Foundation Louis Vuitton in Paris on 25 July 2024, wearing a black-velvet Louis Vuitton tracksuit, where she performed a medley of "Thata Ahh", "Jump" and "Water" in an oversized Louis Vuitton jersey and spandex shorts. Tyla performed most of the tracks from the album, including "Breathe Me" and "Water", and cover songs at the 2024 edition of the Summer Sonic Festival in Osaka on 17 August 2024. In a 45-minute-long Tokyo performance the following day, she opened with "Safer" and "On My Body" (performed with Becky G), and closed with "Water". From 23 to 25 August 2024, she performed "Water" at the LaLaLa Festival in Jakarta. Tyla performed a medley of "Water" and "Push 2 Start" in Brooklyn Navy Yard, New York City on 15 October 2024, at the 2024 Victoria's Secret Fashion Show, and again in Co-op Live, Manchester, United Kingdom on 10 November, at the 30th Annual MTV Europe Music Awards.

== Accolades ==
=== Awards and nominations ===
On 10 August 2024, Basadi in Music Awards honoured Tyla with the Highest Airplay accolade for "Water" at the 3rd Annual Basadi In Music Awards. It was awarded the Global Force Award by Billboard on 8 September 2024, at the inaugural Billboard R&B's No. 1s held in New York.

Awards and nominations for "Water"
Organization	Year	Category	Result	Ref.
3Music Awards	2024	African Song of the Year	Won	
Basadi in Music Awards	2024	Music Video of the Year	Nominated	
Basadi in Music Awards	2024	Song of the Year	Won	
Basadi in Music Awards	2024	Pop Artist of the Year	Nominated	
BET Awards	2024	Viewer's Choice Award	Nominated	
Billboard Music Awards	2024	Top R&B Song	Nominated	
Billboard Music Awards	2024	Top Afrobeats Song	Won	
BRIT Awards	2024	International Song	Nominated	
DStv Content Creator Awards	2024	Song of the Year	Won	
Grammy Awards	2024	Best African Music Performance	Won	
iHeartRadio Music Awards	2024	Best Lyrics	Nominated	
iHeartRadio Music Awards	2024	TikTok Bop of the Year	Nominated	
iHeartRadio Music Awards	2025	Dance Song of the Year (Note: With Marshmello.)	Nominated	
iHeartRadio Music Awards	2025	R&B Song of the Year	Nominated	
Ivor Novello Awards	2024	Best Contemporary Song	Nominated	
Metro FM Music Awards	2024	Song of the Year	Nominated	
Metro FM Music Awards	2024	Best Music Video	Nominated	
Metro FM Music Awards	2024	Best Viral Challenge	Nominated	
Metro FM Music Awards	2024	Best R&B	Nominated	
MTV Video Music Awards	2024	Best R&B Video	Nominated	
MTV Video Music Awards	2024	Best Afrobeats Video	Won	
Myx Music Awards	2024	Global Video of the Year	Nominated	
Nickelodeon Kids' Choice Awards	2024	Favorite Viral Song	Nominated	
South African Music Awards	2024	Music Video of the Year	Nominated	
South African Music Awards	2024	Record of the Year	Nominated	
Urban Music Awards	2025	Best Viral Breakthrough Song	Pending	

=== Year-end lists ===
Select year-end rankings of "Water"
Publication	List	Rank	Ref.
The Africa Report	Top Music Hits of 2023	2	
BBC	The best songs of 2023	10	
Billboard	The 100 Best Songs of 2023	18	
Capital UK	The Best Songs of 2023	5	
Complex	The 50 Best Songs Of 2023	6	
Crack	The Top 25 Tracks of the Year	25	
The Hollywood Reporter	The 10 Best Songs of 2023	10	
Independent Online	Top 5 Local Songs of 2023	1	
Los Angeles Times	The 100 best songs of 2023	32	
NME	The 50 best songs of 2023	11	
NPR	The 123 Best Songs of 2023	—N/a	
OkayAfrica	The 20 Best South African Songs of 2023	—N/a	
Rolling Stone	The 100 Best Songs of 2023	68	
Rolling Stone	The 40 Best Afropop Songs of 2023	1	
Stereogum	The Top 40 Pop Songs Of 2023	3	
Variety	The Best Songs of 2023	—N/a	

== Credits and personnel ==
Credits are adapted from the digital liner notes.

Recording

- ACP Studios – Cape Town, South Africa
- SessionsAtlanta Studios – Atlanta, United States

Musicians

- Tyla – lead vocals, background vocals, composer, lyricist
- Sammy Soso – background vocals, programming, bass, arranger, composer, lyricist, producer, vocal producer
- Jack LoMastro – keyboards, songwriter
- Ari PenSmith – background vocals, composer, lyricist
- Imani Lewis – composer, lyricist
- Corey Marlon Lindsay-Keay – songwriter, vocal producer
- Rayan El-Hussein Goufar – songwriter, co-producer
- Olmo Zucca – guitar, composer
- Ebenezer Maxwell – vocal producer
- Jack Lomastro – composer
- Tricky Stewart – composer

Technical

- Ebenezer Maxwell – recording engineer
- Leandro "Dro" Hidalgo – mixing engineer
- Richard Ledesma – recording engineer
- Sammy Soso – recording engineer
- Colin Leonard – mastering

== Charts ==
=== Weekly charts ===
Weekly chart performance for "Water"
Chart (2023–2025)	Peak position
Australia (ARIA)	6
Austria (Ö3 Austria Top 40)	46
Belgium (Ultratop 50 Flanders)	30
Belgium (Ultratop 50 Wallonia)	12
Brazil Hot 100 (Billboard)	59
Bulgaria Airplay (PROPHON)	2
Canada Hot 100 (Billboard)	15
Canada CHR/Top 40 (Billboard)	6
CIS Airplay (TopHit)	32
Croatia International Airplay (Top lista)	26
Denmark (Tracklisten)	10
Estonia Airplay (TopHit)	3
France (SNEP)	22
Germany (GfK)	25
Global 200 (Billboard)	6
Greece International (IFPI)	5
Hungary (Editors' Choice Top 40)	7
Iceland (Tónlistinn)	14
Ireland (IRMA)	6
Israel International Airplay (Media Forest)	13
Japan Hot Overseas (Billboard Japan)	9
Latvia Airplay (LaIPA)	3
Latvia Streaming (LaIPA)	14
Lithuania (AGATA)	14
Luxembourg (Billboard)	6
Middle East and North Africa (IFPI)	11
Netherlands (Dutch Top 40)	26
Netherlands (Single Top 100)	6
New Zealand (Recorded Music NZ)	1
Nigeria (TurnTable Top 100)	13
Norway (VG-lista)	14
Panama (PRODUCE)	10
Philippines (Billboard)	4
Poland (Polish Airplay Top 100)	22
Poland (Polish Streaming Top 100)	83
Portugal (AFP)	9
Romania (UPFR)	1
Romania Airplay (Media Forest)	1
Romania TV Airplay (Media Forest)	4
Singapore (RIAS)	14
Slovakia Airplay (ČNS IFPI)	24
Slovakia Singles Digital (ČNS IFPI)	57
South Africa Streaming (TOSAC)	3
Sweden (Sverigetopplistan)	10
Sweden (Sverigetopplistan) Remix with Travis Scott	75
Switzerland (Schweizer Hitparade)	11
Turkey International Airplay (Radiomonitor Türkiye)	9
Ukraine Airplay (TopHit)	86
United Arab Emirates (IFPI)	1
UK Singles (Official Charts)	4
UK Afrobeats (Official Charts)	1
UK Hip Hop/R&B (Official Charts)	1
US Billboard Hot 100	7
US Adult Pop Airplay (Billboard)	18
US Afrobeats Songs (Billboard)	1
US Dance Airplay (Billboard)	1
US Hot R&B/Hip-Hop Songs (Billboard)	4
US Pop Airplay (Billboard)	6
US Rhythmic Airplay (Billboard)	1
US World Digital Song Sales (Billboard)	1
Venezuela Airplay (Record Report)	36

Chart performance for "Water" (remix)
Chart (2023–2024)	Peak position
Estonia Airplay (TopHit)	66
New Zealand Hot Singles (RMNZ)	6
Sweden (Sverigetopplistan)	75

=== Monthly charts ===
Monthly chart performance for "Water"
Chart (2023–2024)	Peak position
CIS Airplay (TopHit)	35
Estonia Airplay (TopHit)	4
Latvia Airplay (TopHit)	23
Romania Airplay (TopHit)	2
Slovakia (Rádio Top 100)	42
Slovakia (Singles Digitál Top 100)	86

Monthly chart performance for "Water" (remix)
Chart (2024)	Peak position
Estonia Airplay (TopHit)	65

=== Year-end charts ===
2023 year-end chart performance for "Water"
Chart (2023)	Position
Netherlands (Single Top 100)	82
Switzerland (Schweizer Hitparade)	95

2024 year-end chart performance for "Water"
Chart (2024)	Position
Australia (ARIA)	38
Belgium (Ultratop 50 Flanders)	85
Belgium (Ultratop 50 Wallonia)	68
Bulgaria Airplay (PROPHON)	8
Canada (Canadian Hot 100)	39
CIS Airplay (TopHit)	109
Denmark (Tracklisten)	85
Estonia Airplay (TopHit)	121
France (SNEP)	125
Global 200 (Billboard)	18
Netherlands (Single Top 100)	62
New Zealand (Recorded Music NZ)	29
Philippines (Philippines Hot 100)	55
Portugal (AFP)	26
South Africa (TOSAC)	21
Switzerland (Schweizer Hitparade)	43
UK Singles (OCC)	46
US Billboard Hot 100	24
US Hot R&B/Hip-Hop Songs (Billboard)	9
US Pop Airplay (Billboard)	17
US Rhythmic (Billboard)	5
US Afrobeats Songs (Billboard)	1

== Certifications ==
Certifications for "Water"
Region	Certification	Certified units/sales
Australia (ARIA)	4× Platinum	280,000^{‡}
Austria (IFPI Austria)	Platinum	30,000^{‡}
Belgium (BRMA)	Platinum	40,000^{‡}
Brazil (Pro-Música Brasil)	2× Diamond	320,000^{‡}
Canada (Music Canada)	4× Platinum	320,000^{‡}
Denmark (IFPI Danmark)	Platinum	90,000^{‡}
France (SNEP)	Diamond	333,333^{‡}
Germany (BVMI)	Gold	300,000^{‡}
Hungary (MAHASZ)	2× Platinum	8,000^{‡}
Italy (FIMI)	Gold	50,000^{‡}
Mexico (AMPROFON)	Gold	70,000^{‡}
Netherlands (NVPI)	Platinum	93,000^{‡}
New Zealand (RMNZ)	4× Platinum	120,000^{‡}
Nigeria (TCSN)	Gold	50,000^{‡}
Norway (IFPI Norway)	Platinum	60,000^{‡}
Poland (ZPAV)	Platinum	50,000^{‡}
Portugal (AFP)	4× Platinum	100,000^{‡}
South Africa (RISA)	4× Platinum	160,000^{‡}
Spain (Promusicae)	Platinum	60,000^{‡}
Switzerland (IFPI Switzerland)	2× Platinum	60,000^{‡}
United Kingdom (BPI)	2× Platinum	1,200,000^{‡}
United States (RIAA)	4× Platinum	4,000,000^{‡}
Streaming
Greece (IFPI Greece)	2× Platinum	4,000,000^{†}
Sweden (GLF)	Platinum	12,000,000^{†}
^{‡} Sales+streaming figures based on certification alone.^{†} Streaming-only figures based on certification alone.

== Release history ==
Release dates and formats for "Water"
Region	Date	Format(s)	Label(s)	Ref.
Various	28 July 2023	Digital download; streaming	Fax; Epic	
Portugal	28 July 2023	Digital download; streaming	Epic	
United Kingdom	28 July 2023	Digital download; streaming	Since '93; RCA	
United States	3 October 2023	Rhythmic contemporary	Epic	
Italy	13 October 2023	Contemporary hit radio	Sony	
United States	24 October 2023	Contemporary hit radio	Fax; Epic	
Canada	6 December 2023	Contemporary hit radio	FAX; Epic; Sony	

== See also ==
- List of number-one singles from the 2020s (New Zealand)
- List of Billboard Hot 100 top-ten singles in 2023
- List of Billboard Hot 100 top-ten singles in 2024
- Billboard Year-End U.S. Afrobeats Songs of 2024
- List of Billboard Hot R&B/Hip-Hop Songs number ones of 2024
- List of Billboard Rhythmic number-one songs of the 2020s
- List of Media Forest most-broadcast songs of the 2020s in Romania
- List of UK top-ten singles in 2023
- List of UK top-ten singles in 2024
- List of UK R&B Singles Chart number ones of 2023
- List of top 10 singles for 2023 in Australia
