= Burna Boy discography =

Afrobeats recording artist discography

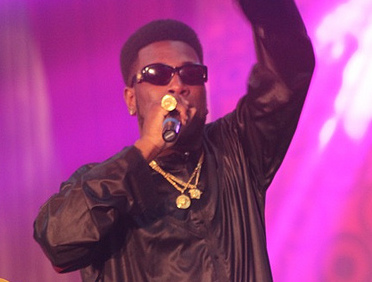
- Studio albums: 8
- EPs: 2
- Singles: 40
- Mixtapes: 2

Nigerian singer Burna Boy has released eight studio albums, two extended plays (EPs), one mixtape, and numerous singles, including both lead and featured appearances. He is widely recognized as one of Africa’s most successful and influential Afrobeats artists, achieving international acclaim for blending Afro-fusion, hip hop, reggae, dancehall, and pop.

== Studio albums ==
List of studio albums, with selected details, chart positions, and certifications
Title	Album details	Peak chart positions										Certifications
Title	Album details	AUS	BEL	CAN	FRA	GER	IRE	NLD	SWE	UK	US	Certifications
L.I.F.E	Released: 12 August 2013; Label: Aristokrat; Formats: CD, digital download	—	—	—	—	—	—	—	—	—	—	
On a Spaceship	Released: 25 November 2015; Label: Spaceship; Formats: CD, digital download	—	—	—	—	—	—	—	—	—	—	
Outside	Released: 26 January 2018; Label: Spaceship, Bad Habit, Atlantic; Formats: CD, digital download	—	—	—	—	—	—	—	—	—	—	
African Giant	Released: 26 July 2019; Label: Spaceship, Atlantic, Warner Music; Formats: CD, digital download	—	58	33	54	80	12	—	—	16	104	BPI: Gold; GLF: Gold; MC: Gold; NVPI: Gold; SNEP: Platinum
Twice as Tall	Released: 14 August 2020; Label: Spaceship, Atlantic, Warner Music; Formats: CD, LP, digital download	—	22	19	29	—	31	10	47	11	54	BPI: Silver
Love, Damini	Released: 8 July 2022; Label: Bad Habit, Spaceship, Atlantic; Formats: CD, LP, digital download	—	24	6	17	61	23	2	12	2	14	BPI: Gold; GLF: Gold; MC: Platinum; NVPI: Gold; SNEP: Gold
I Told Them...	Released: 25 August 2023; Label: Bad Habit, Spaceship, Atlantic; Formats: CD, digital download	56	20	18	6	46	25	2	7	1	31	BPI: Gold; MC: Gold
No Sign of Weakness	Released: 11 July 2025; Label: Spaceship, Atlantic, Warner Music; Formats: CD, digital download	—	136	65	58	—	—	57	—	6	200	
"—" denotes a recording that did not chart or was not released in that territory.

== Mixtapes ==
- Burn Notice (2011)
- Burn Identity (2012)

== Extended plays ==
- Redemption (2016)
- Steel & Copper (with DJDS) (2019)

== Singles ==
=== As lead artist ===
List of singles as a lead artist, with selected chart positions and certifications, year released, and album name
Title	Year	Peak chart positions										Certifications	Album
Title	Year	AUS	CAN	FRA	IRE	NZ	SA	SWE	UK	US	WW	Certifications	Album
"Like to Party"	2012	—	—	—	—	—	—	—	—	—	—		L.I.F.E
"Tonight"	2012	—	—	—	—	—	—	—	—	—	—		L.I.F.E
"Run My Race"	2013	—	—	—	—	—	—	—	—	—	—		L.I.F.E
"Yawa Dey"	2013	—	—	—	—	—	—	—	—	—	—		L.I.F.E
"Celebrate"	2013	—	—	—	—	—	—	—	—	—	—		Non-album singles
"Won Da Mo" (featuring D'banj)	2013	—	—	—	—	—	—	—	—	—	—		Non-album singles
"Rockstar"	2014	—	—	—	—	—	—	—	—	—	—		Non-album singles
"Don Gorgon"	2014	—	—	—	—	—	—	—	—	—	—		Non-album singles
"Check and Balance"	2014	—	—	—	—	—	—	—	—	—	—		Non-album singles
"Soke"	2015	—	—	—	—	—	—	—	—	—	—		On a Spaceship
"The Realest"	2015	—	—	—	—	—	—	—	—	—	—		On a Spaceship
"Rizzla"	2015	—	—	—	—	—	—	—	—	—	—		On a Spaceship
"Pree Me"	2016	—	—	—	—	—	—	—	—	—	—		Redemption
"Mandem Anthem"	2016	—	—	—	—	—	—	—	—	—	—		Non-album singles
"Hallelujah"	2017	—	—	—	—	—	—	—	—	—	—		Non-album singles
"Rock Your Body"	2017	—	—	—	—	—	—	—	—	—	—		Outside
"Streets of Africa"	2017	—	—	—	—	—	—	—	—	—	—		Outside
"Koni Baje"	2017	—	—	—	—	—	—	—	—	—	—		Outside
"Sekkle Down" (featuring J Hus)	2017	—	—	—	—	—	—	—	—	—	—	BPI: Silver	Outside
"Heaven's Gate" (featuring Lily Allen)	2018	—	—	—	—	—	—	—	—	—	—		Outside
"Ye"	2018	—	—	—	—	—	—	—	—	—	—	BPI: Platinum; GLF: Platinum; MC: Platinum; RIAA: Platinum; RMNZ: Platinum; SNEP: Platinum	Outside
"On the Low"	2018	—	—	78	—	—	—	—	—	—	—	ARIA: Gold; BPI: Platinum; GLF: Platinum; MC: 2× Platinum; RIAA: Gold; RMNZ: Platinum; SNEP: Diamond	African Giant
"Gbona"	2018	—	—	—	—	—	—	— (Note: "Gbona" did not enter the Swedish Singellista Chart, but peaked at number 11 on the Swedish Heatseeker Chart.)	—	—	—	BPI: Gold; GLF: Gold; MC: Platinum; RMNZ: Gold; SNEP: Diamond	African Giant
"Killin Dem" (featuring Zlatan)	2018	—	—	—	—	—	—	—	—	—	—		African Giant
"Dangote"	2019	—	—	—	—	—	—	—	—	—	—		African Giant
"Anybody"	2019	—	—	—	—	—	—	—	—	—	—	BPI: Silver; MC: Gold; SNEP: Gold	African Giant
"Pull Up"	2019	—	—	—	—	—	—	—	—	—	—		African Giant
"Money Play"	2019	—	—	—	—	—	—	—	—	—	—		Non-album singles
"Odogwu"	2020	—	—	—	—	—	—	—	—	—	—		Non-album singles
"Wonderful"	2020	—	—	—	—	—	—	—	—	—	—		Twice as Tall
"20 10 20"	2020	—	—	—	—	—	—	—	—	—	—		Non-album single
"Monsters You Made" (featuring Chris Martin)	2020	—	—	—	—	—	—	—	—	—	—		Twice as Tall
"Real Life" (featuring Stormzy)	2020	—	—	—	—	—	—	—	54	—	—	ARIA: Gold; BPI: Silver; RMNZ: Gold	Twice as Tall
"Way Too Big"	2020	—	—	—	—	—	—	—	—	—	—		Twice as Tall
"Kilometre"	2021	—	—	—	—	—	84	—	—	—	—	MC: Gold	Love, Damini
"Question" (featuring Don Jazzy)	2021	—	—	—	—	—	—	—	—	—	—		Non-album singles
"Want It All" (featuring Polo G)	2021	—	—	—	—	—	—	—	—	—	—		Non-album singles
"B. d'Or" (featuring Wizkid)	2021	—	—	—	—	—	—	—	—	—	—		Non-album singles
"Last Last"	2022	79	30	23	27	12	1	21	4	44	39	ARIA: Platinum; BPI: 2× Platinum; GLF: Platinum; MC: 4× Platinum; RIAA: Platinum; RMNZ: 3× Platinum; SNEP: Diamond	Love, Damini
"For My Hand" (featuring Ed Sheeran)	2022	—	63	173	47	— (Note: "For My Hand" did not enter the NZ Top 40 Singles Chart, but peaked at number 15 on the NZ Hot Singles Chart.)	4	38	18	— (Note: "For My Hand" did not enter the US Billboard Hot 100, but peaked at number 13 on the Bubbling Under Hot 100 Singles chart.)	52	ARIA: Gold; BPI: Platinum; GLF: Platinum; MC: 2× Platinum; RMNZ: Gold; SNEP: Gold	Love, Damini
"Sittin' on Top of the World" (solo or featuring 21 Savage)	2023	—	—	—	—	36	—	—	36	80	—	BPI: Silver; MC: Gold; RMNZ: Gold	I Told Them...
"Talibans II" (with Byron Messia)	2023	—	53	—	—	— (Note: "Talibans II" did not enter the NZ Top 40 Singles Chart, but peaked at number 39 on the NZ Hot Singles Chart.)	—	—	—	99	—	MC: Gold	I Told Them...
"Big 7"	2023	—	—	—	—	— (Note: "Big 7" did not enter the NZ Top 40 Singles Chart, but peaked at number 13 on the NZ Hot Singles Chart.)	—	—	53	—	—		I Told Them...
"Cheat on Me" (featuring Dave)	2023	—	—	109	42	9	—	65	19	—	194	BPI: Silver	I Told Them...
"City Boys"	2023	—	70	27	44	12	—	58	14	— (Note: "City Boys" did not enter the US Billboard Hot 100, but peaked at number 20 on the Bubbling Under Hot 100 Singles chart.)	143	BPI: Gold; MC: Platinum; RIAA: Gold; RMNZ: Gold; SNEP: Platinum	I Told Them...
"Tested, Approved & Trusted"	2024	—	—	—	—	— (Note: "Tested, Approved & Trusted" did not enter the NZ Top 40 Singles Chart, but peaked at number 19 on the NZ Hot Singles Chart.)	—	—	—	—	—	MC: Gold; RMNZ: Gold	I Told Them...
"Higher"	2024	—	—	—	—	— (Note: "Higher" did not enter the NZ Top 40 Singles Chart, but peaked at number 32 on the NZ Hot Singles Chart.)	—	—	99	—	—		Non-album single
"Bundle by Bundle"	2024	—	—	—	—	—	—	—	—	—	—		No Sign of Weakness
"Update"	2025	—	—	—	—	—	—	—	—	—	—		No Sign of Weakness
"Sweet Love"	2025	—	—	—	—	—	—	—	—	—	—		No Sign of Weakness
"TaTaTa" (featuring Travis Scott)	2025	—	—	—	—	— (Note: "TaTaTa" did not enter the NZ Top 40 Singles Chart, but peaked at number 5 on the NZ Hot Singles Chart.)	—	—	84	—	—		No Sign of Weakness
"Dai Dai" (with Shakira)	2026	10	3	3	5	13	7	5	2	17	1	BPI: Gold; GLF: Platinum; MC: 2× Platinum; RIAA: 2× Platinum (Latin); SNEP: Diamond	Official FIFA World Cup 2026 Album
"—" denotes a recording that did not chart or was not released in that territory.

=== As featured artist ===
List of singles as a featured artist, with selected chart positions and certifications, year released, and album name
Title	Year	Peak chart positions									Certifications	Album
Title	Year	AUS	CAN	FRA	IRE	SUR	SWE	UK	US	WW	Certifications	Album
"Location" (Dave featuring Burna Boy)	2019	—	—	—	20	—	— (Note: "Location" did not enter the Swedish Singellista Chart, but peaked at number 12 on the Swedish Heatseeker Chart.)	6	—	—	BPI: 5× Platinum; GLF: Platinum; MC: Platinum; RIAA: Gold; RMNZ: 3× Platinum; SNEP: Diamond	Psychodrama
"Simmer" (Mahalia featuring Burna Boy)	2019	—	—	—	—	—	—	46	—	—	BPI: Gold; MC: Gold	Love and Compromise
"Be Honest" (Jorja Smith featuring Burna Boy)	2019	77	—	28	20	—	—	8	—	—	ARIA: Platinum; BPI: Platinum; MC: Gold; RMNZ: Platinum; SNEP: Diamond	Non-album single
"Own It" (Stormzy featuring Ed Sheeran and Burna Boy)	2019	40	82	—	2	—	30	1	—	—	ARIA: Gold; BPI: 3× Platinum; RMNZ: Platinum	Heavy Is the Head
"Jerusalema" (Remix) (Master KG featuring Nomcebo Zikode and Burna Boy)	2020	—	—	2	4	1	—	—	—	38	SNEP: Diamond	Jerusalema
"My Oasis" (Sam Smith featuring Burna Boy)	2020	84	70	—	43	2	— (Note: "My Oasis" did not enter the Swedish Singellista Chart, but peaked at number one on the Swedish Heatseeker Chart.)	43	— (Note: "My Oasis" did not enter the US Billboard Hot 100, but peaked at number 12 on the Bubbling Under Hot 100 Singles chart.)	—	ARIA: Gold; BPI: Silver; MC: Gold	Love Goes
"Ginger" (Wizkid featuring Burna Boy)	2020	—	—	—	—	—	—	67	—	—	BPI: Silver; MC: Gold; RIAA: Gold	Made in Lagos
"Hey Boy" (Sia featuring Burna Boy)	2021	—	—	—	—	—	—	—	—	—		Music
"Rollin'" (Mist featuring Burna Boy)	2021	—	—	—	—	—	—	46	—	—		Non-album singles
"I Feel It" (Jon Bellion featuring Burna Boy)	2021	—	—	—	—	—	—	—	—	—		Non-album singles
"Mera Na" (Sidhu Moose Wala featuring Burna Boy)	2023	—	14	—	—	—	—	87	—	— (Note: "Mera Na" did not enter the Billboard Global 200, but peaked at number 102 on the Billboard Global Excl. US chart.)		Non-album singles
"We Pray" (Coldplay featuring Little Simz, Elyanna, Tini, and Burna Boy)	2024	—	92	45	7	11	79	20	87	50	ARIA: Gold; BPI: Silver; RMNZ: Gold; SNEP: Platinum	Moon Music
"4 Kampé II" (Joé Dwèt Filé featuring Burna Boy)	2025	—	—	61	—	—	—	—	—	—	SNEP: Gold	Non-album single
"WGFT" (Gunna featuring Burna Boy)	2025	96	46	—	93	—	91	22	16	60	BPI: Gold; RMNZ: Platinum	The Last Wun
"—" denotes a recording that did not chart or was not released in that territory.

== Other charted and certified songs ==
List of songs, with selected chart positions and certifications, showing year released and album name
Title	Year	Peak chart positions										Certifications	Album
Title	Year	AUS	CAN	FRA	IRE	NZ Hot	SA	SWE	UK	US	WW	Certifications	Album
"Good Time" (J Hus featuring Burna Boy)	2017	—	—	—	—	—	—	—	88	—	—		Common Sense
"Gum Body" (featuring Jorja Smith)	2019	—	—	—	—	—	—	—	—	—	—	BPI: Silver; MC: Gold	African Giant
"Collateral Damage"	2019	—	—	—	—	—	—	—	—	—	—	SNEP: Gold	African Giant
"Secret" (featuring Jeremi and Serani)	2019	—	—	—	—	—	—	—	—	—	—	BPI: Silver	African Giant
"Donne-moi l'accord" (Dadju featuring Burna Boy)	2019	—	—	131	—	—	—	—	—	—	—	SNEP: Platinum	Poison
"Play Play" (J Hus featuring Burna Boy)	2020	—	—	—	38	—	—	—	11	—	—	BPI: Platinum	Big Conspiracy
"Siberia" (Headie One featuring Burna Boy)	2021	—	—	—	72	27	—	—	35	—	—		Edna
"Loved by You" (Justin Bieber featuring Burna Boy)	2021	68	31	—	—	—	—	100	—	87	51		Justice
"Glory" (featuring Ladysmith Black Mambazo)	2022	—	—	—	—	—	46	—	—	—	—		Love, Damini
"Science"	2022	—	—	—	—	—	56	—	—	—	—		Love, Damini
"Cloak & Dagger" (featuring J Hus)	2022	—	—	—	—	—	47	—	47	—	—		Love, Damini
"Jagele"	2022	—	—	—	—	—	61	—	—	—	—		Love, Damini
"Whiskey"	2022	—	—	—	—	—	86	—	—	—	—		Love, Damini
"Different Size" (featuring Vict0ny)	2022	—	—	—	—	—	44	—	—	—	—		Love, Damini
"It's Plenty"	2022	—	—	—	—	23	17	—	—	—	—	BPI: Silver; MC: Platinum; RMNZ: Gold; SNEP: Gold	Love, Damini
"Toni-Ann Singh" (featuring Popcaan)	2022	—	—	—	—	—	—	—	—	—	—	MC: Gold	Love, Damini
"Dirty Secrets"	2022	—	—	—	—	—	99	—	—	—	—		Love, Damini
"Solid" (featuring Blxst and Kehlani)	2022	—	—	—	—	30	58	—	—	—	—		Love, Damini
"Rollercoaster" (featuring J Balvin)	2022	—	—	—	—	—	88	—	—	—	—		Love, Damini
"Vanilla"	2022	—	—	—	—	—	73	—	—	—	—		Love, Damini
"Common Person"	2022	—	—	—	—	—	71	—	—	—	—		Love, Damini
"Wild Dreams" (featuring Khalid)	2022	—	—	—	—	—	82	55	—	—	—		Love, Damini
"Alone"	2022	—	73	19	50	2	55	— (Note: "Alone" did not enter the Swedish Singellista Chart, but peaked at number seven on the Swedish Heatseeker Chart.)	28	—	143	BPI: Silver; RIAA: Gold; RMNZ: Gold; SNEP: Gold	Black Panther: Wakanda Forever – Music from and Inspired By
"Just Like Me" (with 21 Savage and Metro Boomin)	2024	—	49	—	—	—	—	—	—	67	93		American Dream
"Don't Let Me Drown"	2025	—	—	—	—	32	—	—	—	—	—		F1 the Album
"Teary Eyes" (with YoungBoy Never Broke Again)	2026	—	—	—	—	—	—	—	—	— (Note: "Teary Eyes" did not chart on the Billboard Hot 100, but peaked at number 23 on the Bubbling Under Hot 100 chart.)	—		Slime Cry
"—" denotes a recording that did not chart or was not released in that territory.

== Other guest appearances ==
Year	Artist	Title	Album
2013	Wande Coal	"Amorawa"	Wanted
2013	Ice Prince	"Gimme Dat" (also featuring Yung L and Olamide)	Fire of Zamani
2014	DJ Spinall	"Gba Gbe E"	My Story: The Album
2014	AKA	"All Eyes on Me" (also featuring Da L.E.S and JR)	Levels
2014	Sarkodie	"Special Someone" (also featuring AKA)	Sarkology
2016	Skales	"Temper" (Remix)	The Never Say Never Guy
2017	Airboy	"Ayepo" (Remix)	Non-album singles
2017	Skales	"Gbefun One Time"	The Never Say Never Guy
2017	Jesse Jagz	"Violation"	Odysseus
2018	Four of Diamonds	"Name On It"	TBA
2018	Fall Out Boy	"Sunshine Riptide"	Mania
2018	Lily Allen	"Your Choice"	No Shame
2018	DJ Spinall	"Serious"	Iyanu
2018	Larry Gaaga	"Baba Nla" (also featuring 2Baba and D'banj)	Non-album single
2018	Major Lazer	"All My Life"	Africa Is the Future
2018	Show Dem Camp	"Legend"	Palm Wine Music 2
2018	Peruzzi	"Champion Lover"	Heartwork
2019	Sauti Sol	"Afrikan Star"	Afrikan Sauce
2019	Beyoncé	"Ja Ara E"	The Lion King: The Gift
2019	DJ Snake	"No Option"	Carte Blanche
2019	IDK	"December"	Is He Real
2019	Wretch 32	"All In"	Upon Reflection
2020	2Baba	"We Must Groove"	Warriors
2020	Pop Smoke	"Enjoy Yourself" (Remix)	Shoot for the Stars, Aim for the Moon (Deluxe)
2020	Shocka	"Intro" (Burna Boy Speaks)	Impact Over Numbers
2021	Becky G	"Rotate"	Non-album single
2021	John Legend	"Coming 2 America"	El Rey De Zamunda 2 (Amazon Original Motion Picture Soundtrack)
2021	Black Sherif	''Second Semon Remix''	Non-album singles
2021	Angélique Kidjo	''Do Yourself''	Mother Nature
2022	Asake	"Sungba (Remix)"	Mr. Money with the Vibe
2022	None	"Alone"	Black Panther: Wakanda Forever - Music From and Inspired By
2023	Diddy	"Burna Boy Interlude"	The Love Album: Off the Grid
2024	21 Savage, Metro Boomin	"Just Like Me"	American Dream
2026	YoungBoy Never Broke Again	"Teary Eyes"	Slime Cry

== Music videos ==
Year	Title	Director	Ref
2015	"P.A.I.D"	Sesan	
2016	"Pree Me"	Meji Alabi	
2017	"Deja Vu"	Clarence Peters	
"Hallelujah"	Mat Max		
2018	"Heaven's Gate"/"Sekkle Down"		
2018	"Ye"	Clarence Peters	
2018	"Gbona"	Clarence Peters	
2018	"On the Low"	Meji Alabi	
2019	"Killin Dem"	Prodigeezy	
2019	"Dangote"	Clarence Peters	
2019	"Anybody"	Clarence Peters	
2019	"Pull Up"	Meji Alabi	
2019	"Gum Body"(featuring Jorja Smith)	Meji Alabi	
2019	"Own It" (Stormzy featuring Ed Sheeran and Burna Boy)	Nathan James Tettey	
2020	"Odogwu"	TG Omori	
2020	Wonderful	Director K	
2020	"Monsters you made"	Meji Alabi	
2020	"Real life" (featuring Stormzy)	Meji Alabi	
2020	"Way too big"	Meji Alabi	
2021	"Hey Boy" (Sia featuring Burna Boy)	Rafatoon	
2021	"Ginger" (Wizkid featuring Burna Boy)	Meji Alabi	
2022	"Do Yourself" (Angélique Kidjo featuring Burna Boy)	Meji Alabi	
