= Billboard Year-End U.S. Afrobeats Songs of 2024 =

Year-end list

The Billboard Year-End U.S. Afrobeats Songs of 2024 ranks the best-performing Afrobeats songs in the United States. Published by Billboard magazine on December 13, 2024, it showcase the aggregated metrics compiled by Luminate from October 28, 2023, through October 19, 2024.

== Year-end list ==
List of songs on Billboard's 2024 Year-End U.S. Afrobeats Songs chart.
No.	Title	Artist(s)
1	"Water"	Tyla
2	"Calm Down"	Rema and Selena Gomez
3	"Me & U"	Tems
4	"Truth or Dare"	Tyla
5	"Jump"	Tyla, Gunna and Skillibeng
6	"Move"	Adam Port and Stryv featuring Malachiii
7	"Love Me JeJe"	Tems
8	"People"	Libianca
9	"Art"	Tyla
10	"City Boys"	Burna Boy
11	"Tshwala Bam"	TitoM and Yuppe featuring EeQue and S.N.E
12	"Talibans"	Byron Messia and Burna Boy
13	"Angels in Tibet"	Amaarae
14	"Free Fall"	Tems featuring J. Cole
15	"Commas"	Ayra Starr
16	"No.1"	Tyla featuring Tems
17	"Favorite Girl"	Darkoo and Dess Dior
18	"Holy Ghost"	Omah Lay
19	"Not an Angel"	Tems
20	"Last Heartbreak Song"	Ayra Starr
21	"Active"	Asake and Travis Scott
22	"On and On"	Tyla
23	"This Year" (Blessings)	Victor Thompson and Gunna featuring Ehis D'Greatest
24	"Happiness"	Sarz, Asake and Gunna
25	"Egwu"	Chike and MohBad
26	"Tested, Approved & Trusted"	Burna Boy
27	"Wickedest"	Tems
28	"Higher"	Burna Boy
29	"Wave"	Asake and Central Cee
30	"Bad Vibes"	Ayra Starr and Seyi Vibez
31	"Safer"	Tyla
32	"Princess Going Digital"	Amaarae
33	"Cast"	Shallipopi featuring Odumodublvck
34	"Ngozi"	Crayon and Ayra Starr
35	"Twe Twe"	Kizz Daniel
36	"IDK"	Wizkid and Zlatan
37	"Get it Right"	Tems featuring Asake
38	"MMS"	Asake and Wizkid
39	"Soh-Soh"	Odeal
40	"Lonely at the Top"	Asake
41	"Blood on the Dance Floor"	Odumodublvck, Bloody Civilian and Wale
42	"On My Body"	Tyla and Becky G
43	"Different Pattern"	Seyi Vibez
44	"Breathe Me"	Tyla
45	"Benin Boys"	Rema and Shallipopi
46	"Famax"	Raffa Guido
47	"DND"	Rema
48	"Stubborn"	Victony and Asake
49	"Sittin' on Top of the World"	Burna Boy and 21 Savage
50	"Cana"	Seyi Vibez

== Songs Artists year-end list ==
Below is the list of Billboard U.S. Afrobeats Songs Artists of 2024.

1. Tyla
2. Tems
3. Rema
4. Burna Boy
5. Asake
6. Ayra Starr
7. Libianca
8. Amaarae
9. Seyi Vibez
10. Omah Lay
