= List of awards and nominations received by Burna Boy =

Burna Boy awards and nominations
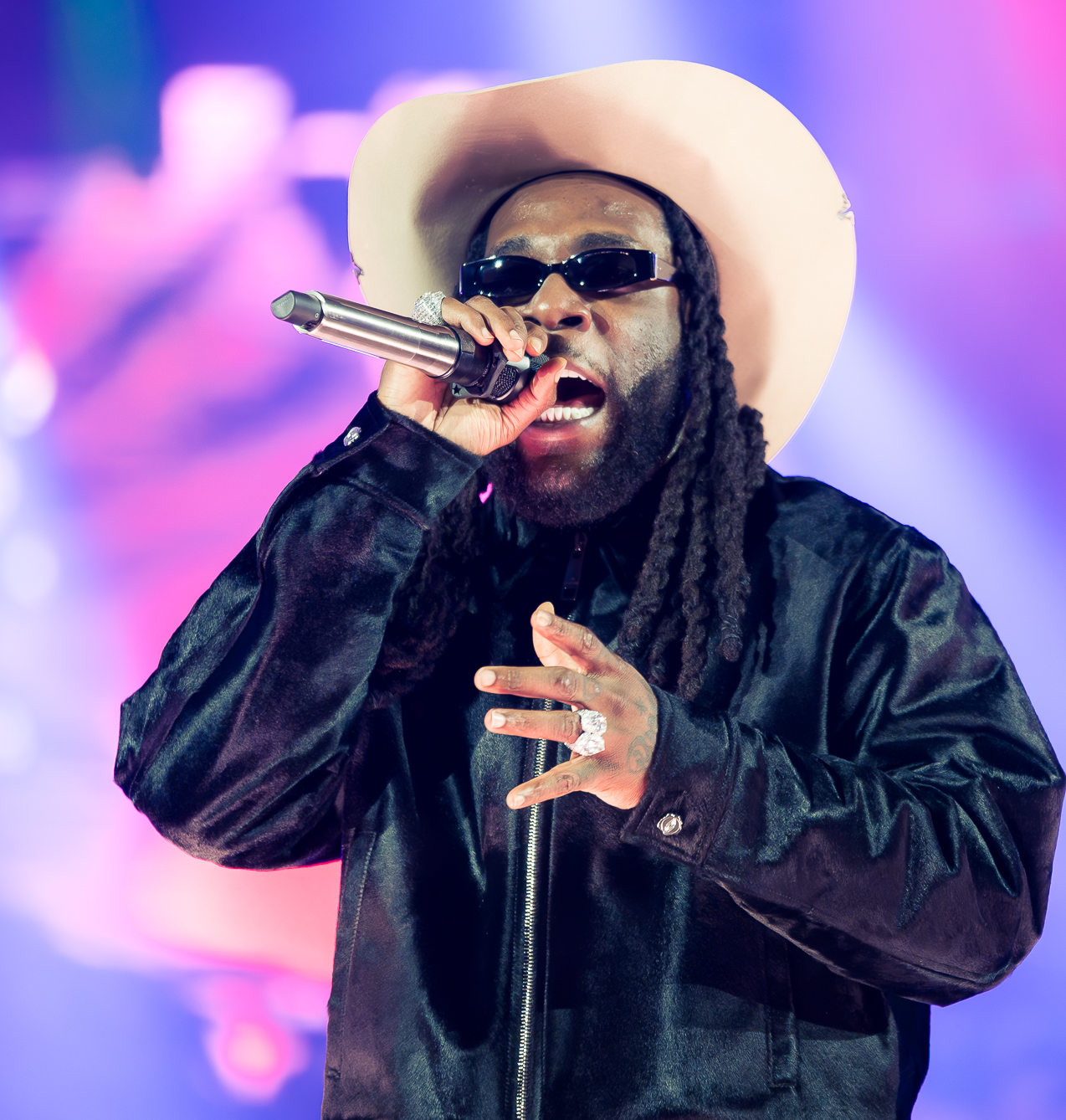
- Burna Boy in 2024
Awards and nominations
Award	Wins	Nominations

This is a list of awards and nominations received by Burna Boy, a Nigerian singer and songwriter. He began his music career in 2010, for which He has received numerous awards and honorary accolades. Overall, Burna Boy has won (1) Grammy Awards from (11) nominations.

Year	Event	Prize	Recipient	Result	Ref
2013	South South Music Awards	South South Music Awards	Himself	Won	
2013	Nigeria Entertainment Awards	Best New Act of the Year	Himself	Won	
2013	The Headies	Next Rated	Himself	Nominated	
2013	The Headies	Best R&B Single	"Like to Party"	Nominated	
2014	MTV Africa Music Awards	Best New Act	Himself	Nominated	
2014	The Headies	Best R&B Single	"Don Gorgon"	Nominated	
2014	The Headies	Best R&B/Pop Album	L.I.F.E	Nominated	
2014	The Headies	Hip Hop World Revelation of the Year	L.I.F.E	Nominated	
2014	The Headies	Album of the Year	L.I.F.E	Nominated	
2015	Nigeria Entertainment Awards	Best Pop Artist of the Year	Himself	Won	
2015	Nigeria Entertainment Awards	Album of the Year	L.I.F.E	Won	
2015	MTV Africa Music Awards	Best Collaboration	"All Eyes on Me" (AKA featuring Burna Boy, Da L.E.S and JR)	Won	
2015	All Africa Music Awards	Best African Collaboration	"All Eyes on Me" (AKA featuring Burna Boy, Da L.E.S and JR)	Won	
2018	African Musik Magazine Awards	Best African DanceHall/Reggae Act	Himself	Won	
2018	African Musik Magazine Awards	Best Live Act	Himself	Nominated	
2018	Nigeria Entertainment Awards	Album of the Year	Outside	Won	
2019	Soundcity MVP Awards Festival	Listener's Choice	"Ye"	Won	
2019	Soundcity MVP Awards Festival	Song of the Year	"Ye"	Won	
2019	Soundcity MVP Awards Festival	Viewer's Choice	"Ye"	Nominated	
2019	Soundcity MVP Awards Festival	Best Male MVP	Himself	Won	
2019	Soundcity MVP Awards Festival	African Artiste of the Year	Himself	Won	
2019	BET Awards	Best International Act	Himself	Won	
2019	The Headies	Viewer's Choice	Himself	Nominated	
2019	The Headies	Artiste of the Year	Himself	Won	
2019	The Headies	Best Recording of the Year	"Ye"	Nominated	
2019	The Headies	Best Pop Single	"Ye"	Nominated	
2019	The Headies	Song of the Year	"Ye"	Won	
2019	The Headies	Best R&B/Pop Album	Outside	Nominated	
2019	The Headies	Album of the Year	Outside	Nominated	
2019	The Headies	Best Collaboration	"Killin' Dem" (featuring Zlatan)	Won	
2019	MTV Europe Music Awards	Best African Act	Himself	Won	
2019	Future Awards Africa	Future Award Prize for Music	Himself	Won	
2019	Future Awards Africa	Future Prize for Young Person of the Year	Himself	Won	
2019	African Muzik Magazine Awards	Song of the Year	"Killin' Dem" (featuring Zlatan)	Won	
2019	African Muzik Magazine Awards	Best Collaboration	"Killin' Dem" (featuring Zlatan)	Won	
2019	African Muzik Magazine Awards	Video of the Year	"Killin' Dem" (featuring Zlatan)	Nominated	
2019	African Muzik Magazine Awards	Best Live Act	Himself	Nominated	
2019	African Muzik Magazine Awards	Artist of the Year	Himself	Won	
2019	African Muzik Magazine Awards	Best Male West Africa	Himself	Won	
2019	African Muzik Magazine Awards	Crossing Boundaries with Music	Himself	Nominated	
2019	All Africa Music Awards	West African Male Artiste of the Year	Himself	Won	
2019	All Africa Music Awards	Artiste of the Year in Africa	Himself	Won	
2019	All Africa Music Awards	Album of the Year	African Giant	Nominated	
2019	All Africa Music Awards	Best African Collaboration	"Killin' Dem" (featuring Zlatan)	Nominated	
2019	All Africa Music Awards	Song of the Year in Africa	"On the Low"	Nominated	
2019	Ghana Music Awards	African Artiste of the Year	Himself	Won	
2020	Soundcity MVP Awards Festival	Song of the Year	"Killin' Dem" (featuring Zlatan)	Won	
2020	Soundcity MVP Awards Festival	Best Collaboration	"Killin' Dem" (featuring Zlatan)	Nominated	
2020	Soundcity MVP Awards Festival	African Artiste of The Year	Himself	Won	
2020	Soundcity MVP Awards Festival	Best Male MVP	Himself	Won	
2020	Soundcity MVP Awards Festival	Listeners' Choice	Burna Boy for "Killin' Dem"	Nominated	
2020	Soundcity MVP Awards Festival	Viewers' Choice	Burna Boy for "On the Low"	Nominated	
2020	Ghana Music Awards	African Artiste of the Year	Himself	Won	
2020	African Musik Magazine Awards	Crossing Boundaries with Music	Himself	Won	
2020	African Musik Magazine Awards	Best Collaboration	"Jerusalema" (Remix) (Master KG featuring Nomcebo Zikode and Burna Boy)	Won	
2020	African Musik Magazine Awards	Best Male West Africa	Himself	Nominated	
2020	African Musik Magazine Awards	Artiste of the Year	Himself	Nominated	
2020	African Musik Magazine Awards	Best Live Act	Himself	Nominated	
2020	African Musik Magazine Awards	Song of the Year	"Anybody"	Nominated	
2020	Grammy Awards	Best World Music Album	African Giant	Nominated	
2020	Brit Awards	Best International Solo Act	Himself	Nominated	
2020	Brit Awards	Song of the Year	"Location" (Dave featuring Burna Boy)	Nominated	
2020	BET Awards	Best International Act	Himself	Won	
2020	Edison Award	Best World Album	African Giant	Won	
2020	MOBO Awards	Best International Act	Himself	Won	
2020	MOBO Awards	Best African Act	Himself	Nominated	
2020	MTV Europe Music Awards	Best African Act	Himself	Nominated	
2021	Grammy Awards	Best Global Music Album	Twice as Tall	Won	
2021	Brit Awards	International Male Solo Artist	Himself	Nominated	
2021	Global Music Awards Africa	Artiste of the Year	Himself	Won	
2021	Global Music Awards Africa	Global Reggae/Dancehall Artiste of the Year	Himself	Nominated	
2021	BET Awards	Best International Act	Himself	Won	
2022	NME Awards	Best Solo Act	Himself	Won	
2022	MOBO Awards	Best African Music Act	Himself	Won	
2022	MOBO Awards	Best International Act	Himself	Won	
2022	The Headies	Best African Artiste of the year	Himself	Won	
2022	The Headies	Best Male Artiste of the year	Himself	Won	
2022	Soul Train Awards	Song of the Year	"Last Last"	Nominated	
2022	Soul Train Awards	Video of the Year	"Last Last"	Nominated	
2022	Soul Train Awards	The Ashford & Simpson Songwriter's Award	"Last Last"	Nominated	
2022	Soul Train Awards	R&B/Soul Male Artist	Himself	Nominated	
2022	Ghana Music Awards UK	African Artiste of the Year	Himself	Won	
2022	MTV Europe Music Awards	Best African Act	Himself	Won	
2022	American Music Awards	Favorite Afrobeats Artist	Himself	Nominated	
2022	African Muzik Magazine Awards	Artist of the Year	Himself	Won	
2022	African Muzik Magazine Awards	Best Live Act	Himself	Nominated	
2022	African Muzik Magazine Awards	Best Male West Africa	Himself	Nominated	
2022	African Muzik Magazine Awards	Best Collaboration	"Sungba" (Remix)	Nominated	
2022	Grammy Awards	Best Global Music Performance	Do Yourself	Nominated	
2022	Grammy Awards	Album of the Year	Justice	Nominated	
2023	Grammy Awards	Best Global Music Performance	"Last Last"	Nominated	
2023	Grammy Awards	Best Global Music Album	Love, Damini	Nominated	
2023	Soundcity MVP Awards	African Artiste of the Year	Himself	Won	
2023	All Africa Music Awards	Artist of the Year	Himself	Won	
2023	All Africa Music Awards	Song of the Year	"Last Last"	Nominated	
2023	All Africa Music Awards	Album of the Year	Love, Damini	Won	
2023	Brit Awards	International Artist of the Year	Himself	Nominated	
2023	BreakTudo Awards	Global Artist	Himself	Nominated	
2023	The Headie Awards	Best R&B Single	"For My Hand" (featuring Ed Sheeran)	Won	
2023	The Headie Awards	Afrobeats Single of the Year	"Last Last"	Won	
2023	The Headie Awards	Song of the Year	"Last Last"	Won	
2023	The Headie Awards	Album of the Year	Love Damini	Nominated	
2023	The Headie Awards	Best recording of the Year	Alone	Nominated	
2023	The Headie Awards	Songwriter Of the Year	Himself	Nominated	
2023	The Headie Awards	Best Collaboration	Sungba remix	Nominated	
2023	The Headie Awards	African Artist of the Year	Himself	Nominated	
2023	The Headie Awards	Digital Artist of the Year	Himself	Nominated	
2023	The Headie Awards	Male Artiste of the Year	Himself	Nominated	
2023	BET Awards	Best International Act	Himself	Won	
2023	BET Awards	Best Male R&B/Pop Artist	Himself	Nominated	
2023	BET Awards	Video Director of the Year	Himself	Nominated	
2023	BET Awards	Viewer's Choice Award	"Last Last"	Nominated	
2023	iHeartRadio Music Awards	Afrobeats Artist of the Year	Himself	Nominated	
2023	Planet Rap awards	Best International Artist	Himself	Won	
2023	Billboard Music Awards	Top Afrobeats Artist	Himself	Won	
2023	Galaxy Music Awards	Artist of the Year	Himself	Won	
2023	Rocklan One radio Music Awards	Afrobeats Artist of the Year	Himself	Won	
2023	MTV EMA	Best African Act	Himself	Nominated	
2023	MTV EMA	Best Live	Himself	Nominated	
2023	MTV EMA	Best Afrobeats	Last Last	Nominated	
2024	Grammy Awards	Best Melodic Rap Performance	"Sittin' on Top of the World" (featuring 21 Savage)	Nominated	
2024	Grammy Awards	Best Global Music Performance	"Alone"	Nominated	
2024	Grammy Awards	Best African Music Performance	"City Boys"	Nominated	
2024	Grammy Awards	Best Global Music Album	I Told Them...	Nominated	
2024	Brit Awards	International Artist of the Year	Himself	Nominated	
2024	iHeartRadio Music Awards	Best African Music Act	Himself	Won	
2024	BET Hip Hop Awards	Hip hop Artist of the Year	Himself	Nominated	
2024	BET Hip Hop Awards	Song of the Year	"Sittin' on Top of the World" (featuring 21 Savage)	Nominated	
2024	BET Hip Hop Awards	Best Collaboration of the Year	"Sittin' on Top of the World" (featuring 21 Savage)	Nominated	
2024	BET Hip Hop Awards	Best Hip hop Video	"Sittin' on Top of the World" (featuring 21 Savage)	Nominated	
2024	BET Hip Hop Awards	Lyricist of the Year	Himself	Nominated	
2024	BET Hip Hop Awards	Best live performer	Himself	Nominated	
2024	BET Hip Hop Awards	Hustler of the Year	Himself	Nominated	
2024	NAACP Image Awards	Outstanding Male Artist	Himself	Nominated	
2024	NAACP Image Awards	Outstanding Album	I Told Them...	Nominated	
2024	NAACP Image Awards	Outstanding Duo, Group or Collaboration	"Sittin' on Top of the World" (featuring 21 Savage)	Nominated	
2024	NAACP Image Awards	Outstanding Hip Hop/Rap Song	"Sittin' on Top of the World" (featuring 21 Savage)	Nominated	
2024	NAACP Image Awards	Outstanding International Song	"City Boys"	Nominated	
2024	African Entertainment Awards USA	Best Male Artist	Himself	Nominated	
2024	African Entertainment Awards USA	Artist of the Year	Himself	Nominated	
2024	African Entertainment Awards USA	Best Music Video	"Tshwala Bam"	Nominated	
2024	African Entertainment Awards USA	Song of the Year	"Tshwala Bam"	Nominated	
2024	African Entertainment Awards USA	Best Collaboration	"Tshwala Bam"	Nominated	
2024	African Entertainment Awards USA	Best Collaboration	"Rollercoaster"	Nominated	
2025	African Entertainment Awards USA	Best Male Artist	Himself	Pending	
2025	African Entertainment Awards USA	International Artist of the Year	Himself	Pending	
2025	Grammy Awards	Best African Music Performance	"Higher"	Nominated	
2025	NAACP Image Awards	Outstanding Duo, Group, or Collaboration	"Coming Home" (Usher with Burna Boy)	Nominated	
2025	iHeartRadio Music Awards	World Artist of the Year	Himself	Nominated	
2025	The Headies	Best Recording of the Year	"Higher"	Nominated	
2025	The Headies	Best Performer (Live)	African Giant Live From London	Won	
2025	The Headies	Artiste of the Year	Himself	Nominated	
2026	Grammy Awards	Best Global Music Album	No Sign of Weakness	Nominated	
2026	Grammy Awards	Best African Music Performance	"Love"	Nominated	
2026	All Africa Music Awards				
2026	All Africa Music Awards	Best African Collaboration	"Laho II"	Won	
2026	All Africa Music Awards	Album of the Year	No Sign of Weakness	Won	
2026	American Music Awards	Best Afrobeats Artist	Himself	Nominated	
2026	Premios Juventud	OMG Collaboration	"Dai Dai" (featuring Shakira)	Won	
2026	MTV Video Music Awards	Best Collaboration	"Dai Dai" (featuring Shakira)	Nominated	
2026	MTV Video Music Awards	Best Latin	"Dai Dai" (featuring Shakira)	Nominated	
