= Cheat on Me (Burna Boy song) =

2023 song by Burna Boy

Single by Burna Boy featuring Dave

from the album I Told Them...
- Released: August 22, 2023
- Length: 2:33
- Label: Atlantic; Spaceship; Bad Habit
- Songwriters: Damini Ebunoluwa Ogulu; David Omoregie; Kwabena Adjepong; James Napier; Jacob Jones; Taras Slusarenko; John Sive
- Producers: LiTek; WhYJay; Jay Blu

Burna Boy singles chronology
"Big 7" (2023)	"Cheat on Me" (2023)	"City Boys" (2023)

Dave singles chronology
"Incredible Sauce" (2023)	"Cheat on Me" (2023)	"Meridian/Special" (2023)

Music video
- "Cheat on Me" on YouTube

"Cheat on Me" is a song by Nigerian singer Burna Boy featuring British rapper Dave, released on August 22, 2023, as the fourth single from his seventh studio album, I Told Them... . It was produced by LiTek, WhYJay, and Jay Blu, sampling Kwabs' September 2015, "Cheating on Me".

== Composition ==
The song is described as "pop-soul" by David Smyth for Evening Standard. The production alongside Dave's feature is praised by Alexis Petridis for The Guardian who wrote that "its production hones Burna Boy’s sprawling influences into music that feels punchy, inimitable and impressively streamlined: from Fela Kuti to UK rap, the latter finding expression not merely in a sparkling feature from Dave". NME's Ben Jolley praised the production, stating that the "boasting beats" allow the track to "[sound] like a surefire hit".

== Critical reception ==
Writing for The Independent, Helen Brown wrote that on the track, "Ogulu is more vulnerable" and Dave's "British glottal stops add a grimy punctuation to the pace". According to Ben Jolley for NME, the track is "endlessly-replayable". NotJustOk's Betty Godson wrote that "Dave slides on this track too easily, as his bars belong on an afrobeats jam and that "the collaboration is a success, as the song is pleasant and has high replay quality". Julianne Escobedo Shepherd for Pitchfork stated that the track is "emblematic of Burna Boy’s growth".

== Music video ==
The song's official music video was released alongside its audio. It sees the two artists performing on stage, in New York, and in other places around the globe.

== Charts ==
Weekly chart performance for "Cheat on Me"
Chart (2023)	Peak position
France (SNEP)	109
Global 200 (Billboard)	194
Ireland (IRMA)	42
UK Singles (OCC)	19
UK Afrobeats (OCC)	1
UK Hip Hop/R&B (OCC)	8
World Digital Song Sales (Billboard)	15
