= Love (Burna Boy song) =

2025 single by Burna Boy

Single by Burna Boy

from the album No Sign of Weakness
- Released: 10 July 2025
- Genre: Afrobeats; pop
- Length: 2:56
- Label: Spaceship; Bad Habit; Atlantic
- Songwriters: Damini Ogulu; Andrew Hershey; William Dintenfass
- Producer: Dre Skull

Burna Boy singles chronology
"Don't Let Me Drown" (2025)	"Love" (2025)	"WGFT" (2025)

Music video
- "Love" on YouTube

"Love" is a song by Nigerian singer Burna Boy, released as the fifth and final single from his eight studio album No Sign of Weakness (2025). Produced by Dre Skull, the track blends Afrobeats with elements of pop and dancehall, and has been noted for its emotional lyrics and minimalist production.

== Background and release ==
Following the success of Burna Boy's seventh studio album I Told Them... (2023), he announced a follow-up project in 2024. His eighth studio album, No Sign of Weakness, was released in July 2025, with "Love" serving as the fourth track on the project. The song was released for digital download and streaming on 10 July 2025, by Spaceship Records, Bad Habit, and Atlantic Records.

== Composition and lyrics ==
"Love" features a mid-tempo rhythm driven by Afro-fusion percussion, soft synth melodies, and layered vocal harmonies. The lyrics explore themes of emotional vulnerability, self-worth, and devotion, marking a more introspective side of Burna Boy compared to his previous works.

The song centers on loyalty, trust, and self-protection. In the lyrics, Burna Boy reflects on the importance of surrounding oneself with people who offer genuine love and support, especially during difficult times. He emphasizes loving people especially those who truly love and stand by you, contrasting real loyalty with hypocrisy and false accusations from the world. The song also encourages listeners not to live to impress others, warning that some people may harbor ill intentions.

He further highlights self-reliance, family responsibility, and focusing on personal growth and survival, particularly within the Nigerian environment. Throughout the track, the refrain reinforces the idea that not everyone will reciprocate love, so one should prioritize authenticity, protect their peace, and value those who remain loyal.

== Critical reception ==
Writers for the music website Afrocritik described "Love" as a Dre Skull-produced mid-tempo track in which Burna Boy "flips the script," delivering "a meditation on loyalty and reciprocity." The review highlighted the lines "Na who love me I go love / Na who love us we go love," adding that "the message lands firmly," carried by "a steady bassline." In a less enthusiastic review for Pitchfork, Boutayna Chokrane criticized "Love," writing that its lyrics feel "hollow" and that repetition "registers as filler." She saw the line "fuck the world with the large condom" as "a clunker," adding that its "synth-pop backing" makes it "a jarring line." Chokrane concluded that Burna Boy "doesn’t sound like he’s having fun anymore," but instead "sounds like he’s bracing for a fall no one else is predicting." NME writer Kyann-Sian Williams called "Love" a "lukewarm ballad that drifts off before finding purpose, weighed down by generic sentimentality." Omotoyosi Idowu of Premium Times wrote that "Love" was marked by the line "Na who love us, we go love," and reveals a "quiet unravelling of trust" and vulnerability, describing it as a departure from his usual defiance. Chibuzo Emmanuel of Deeds Magazine said that "Love" was "one of the best songs" on No Sign of Weakness, noting its "somber" focus on "love's redemptive power," and adding that placing it after two "high-octane songs" makes for "a jarring listen."

== Music video and live performances ==
On 8 December 2025, Burna Boy previewed a 22-second clip of the official music video for "Love" on his Instagram page. The official music video was released on 9 December 2025, at 5 PM WAT. Directed by his sister Ronami Ogulu and filmed by Clarence Peters, the video opens with a framed childhood photo of Burna Boy alongside his grandmother.

In December 2025, Burna Boy performed a medley of "Love" and "Update" on The Tonight Show Starring Jimmy Fallon. The episode featured guests Millie Bobby Brown and Kenan Thompson. His set included two dancers, three backing vocalists, and an eight-piece band. The performance coincided with the final dates of his No Sign of Weakness World Tour, which supported his album No Sign of Weakness.

== Credits and personnel ==
- Damini "Burna Boy" Ogulu – vocals, songwriting
- Students of Chalcedony School – choir
- Andrew "Dre Skull" Hershey – production, songwriting
- William Morris Dintenfass – songwriting
- Jackson Haile – assistant mixing
- Millamix – engineering
- Gerhard Westphalen – mastering
- Jesse Ray Ernster – mixing
- Otis Millstone – recording engineer

== Charts ==
Chart performance for "Love"
Chart (2025)	Peak position
Nigeria (TurnTable Top 100)	1
UK Afrobeats (OCC)	4
US Afrobeats Songs (Billboard)	2

== Accolades ==
Awards and nominations for "Love"
Organisation	Year	Category	Result	Ref.
Grammy Awards	2026	Best African Music Performance	Nominated	

== Certifications ==
Certifications for "Love"
Region	Certification	Certified units/sales
Nigeria (TCSN)	Platinum	100,000^{‡}
^{‡} Sales+streaming figures based on certification alone.

== See also ==
- List of number-one songs of 2025 (Nigeria)
