= On a Spaceship =

Studio album by Burna Boy
- Released: 25 November 2015
- Recorded: 2015
- Length: 69:00
- Languages: Yoruba; English
- Labels: Spaceship; Universal
- Producers: Spellz; Emblazon; Deceptikonz; Simba Tagz; J Fem; Sarz; Ell Puto; JayStuntz; Orbeat

Burna Boy chronology
L.I.F.E (2013)	On a Spaceship (2015)	Redemption (2016)

Singles from On a Spaceship
- 1. "Soke" Released: 4 April 2015; 2. "Jealousy" Released: 20 January 2016; 3. "Rizzla" Released: 24 March 2016; 4. "Duro Ni Be" Released: 9 June 2016; 5. "The Realest" Released: 11 July 2016

On a Spaceship is the second studio album by Nigerian singer and songwriter Burna Boy. It was released on 16 November 2015 through Spaceship Records and Universal Music Group. The album features guest appearances from Flavour, Kid X, AKA, Wande Coal, Nyanda, Phyno, Da L.E.S, and Wizkid. Burna Boy enlisted notable producers to handle production such as Spellz, Emblazon, Deceptikonz, Simba Tagz, J Fem, Sarz, Ell Puto, JayStuntz and Orbeat.

== Background and singles ==
Burna Boy revealed the artwork and release date for On a Spaceship on 8 November 2015. The album's lead single and only bonus track "Soke" was released on 4 April 2015 and was produced by Orbeat. The music video for "Soke" was released on 2 May 2015 and was directed by Mattmax. It was nominated for Best Afrobeat Video at the 2015 Nigerian Music Video Awards. The second single off On a Spaceship, "Jealousy" was released on 20 January 2016 and produced by J Fem. The music video for "Jealousy" was released the same day and directed by Unlimited L.A. The third single "Rizzla" was released on 24 March 2016 and was also produced by J Fem. The music video was directed by Mattmax. The album's fourth single "Duro Ni Be" features Phyno and was made available for free digital download by Burna Boy on 9 June 2016. The music video for "Duro Ni Be" was released on 23 May 2016 and directed by Mattmax. The final single, "The Realest" was released on 11 July 2016 and produced by Simba Tagz and directed by Director Cube.

== Critical reception ==
Professional ratings
Review scores
Source	Rating
NotJustOk	5.5/10
Pulse Nigeria	3/5 stars

The album received mixed reviews from critics. Joey Akan of Pulse Nigeria reviewed Burna Boy's album On a Spaceship, expressing his opinion that the album fails to show artistic growth. According to Akan, while Burna Boy's talent is undeniable, the album lacks the direction and innovative spark that was present during his time with Aristokrat Records, particularly due to the absence of producer LeriQ. The album features a mix of good tracks like "The Realest," "Rizzla," and "Soke," but overall, it feels "safe" and doesn't push creative boundaries. Jonathan also noted that the collaboration with Wizkid on "Single" was particularly disappointing, suffering from poor production and mixing. Ultimately, he rated the album a 3 out of 5, describing it as "worth checking out" but not groundbreaking.

Wilfred Okiche of 360nobs reviewed On a Spaceship by Burna Boy, describing it as an overlong and inconsistent album that lacked the cohesive chemistry of his debut due to the absence of producer Leriq. While praising tracks like "Soke" and "If People Must Die" for showcasing Burna Boy's talent, he concluded, "On a Spaceship never comes close to soaring sky high—hell, it never even leaves the ground." Oris Aigbokhaevbolo of Music in Africa, in his review of On a Spaceship, describes the album as Burna Boy's response to the industry's failure to recognize his previous work, particularly L.I.F.E. He observes that while the album starts strong with tracks like "Oluwa Burna," it quickly descends into "a blur of average tunes," largely due to the absence of producer LeriQ. Aigbokhaevbolo views the album as "a kind of vengeful poetry" aimed at those who overlooked Burna Boy's earlier achievements. This approach, he suggests, results in a deliberate underachievement in the album.

Tola Sarumi of NotJustOk described On a Spaceship as a mixed effort, showcasing Burna Boy’s versatility but hindered by a lack of direction and cohesion. While standout tracks like "Soke" reflect his immense talent, the album is weighed down by fillers and inconsistent production, leading Sarumi to conclude that it "fails to take off" and rate it 5.5/10.

== Track listing ==
On a Spaceship track listing
No.	Title	Writer(s)	Producer(s)	Length
1.	"Intro"	Damini Ogulu	—	1:48
2.	"Oluwa Burna"	Ogulu	Spellz	2:59
3.	"The Realest"	Ogulu	Simba Tagz	3:00
4.	"Mine Tonight" (featuring Nyanda)	Ogulu; Nyanda Thorbourne	Orbeat	3:46
5.	"Ring Ring"	Ogulu	Spellz	3:30
6.	"Single" (featuring Wizkid)	Ogulu; Ayodeji Balogun	Simba Tagz	3:31
7.	"Sampudi"	Ogulu	Ell Puto	3:42
8.	"As E Be" (skit)	Ogulu	—	0:43
9.	"Rizzla"	Ogulu	J Fem	3:32
10.	"Jealousy"	Ogulu	J Fem	3:34
11.	"Duro Ni Be" (featuring Phyno)	Ogulu; Chibuzor Azubuike	JayStuntz	3:28
12.	"Another One"	Ogulu	Orbeat	3:22
13.	"Before" (featuring Flavour)	Ogulu; Chinedu Okoli	J Fem	3:31
14.	"Trance"	Ogulu	Sarz	3:36
15.	"On a Very Good Day" (featuring Wande Coal)	Ogulu; Oluwatobi Ojosipe	J Fem	3:43
16.	"Birthday" (featuring AKA, Kid X and Da L.E.S)	Ogulu; Kiernan Forbes; Bonginkosi Mahlangu; Leslie Mampe, Jr.	Emblazon	7:18
17.	"Gone"	Ogulu	Deceptikonz	3:36
18.	"Mi O Ni Gba"	Ogulu	J Fem	2:58
19.	"If People Must Die"	Ogulu	Spellz	3:56
Total length:				69:00

Bonus tracks
No.	Title	Writer(s)	Producer(s)	Length
20.	"Soke"	Ogulu	Orbeat	3:38

Notes

- "—" denotes a skit

== Personnel ==
- Spellz – production
- Simba Tagz – production
- Orbeat – production
- Ell Puto – production
- J Fem – production
- JayStuntz – production
- Sarz – production
- Emblazon – production
- Deceptikonz – production
- Oseni A. Kolade – photography
- Ken Nwadiogbu – album art direction and design

== Release history ==
Release history and formats for On a Spaceship
Region	Date	Format	Label
Various	25 November 2015	CD; digital download	Spaceship
