= Cheat on Me =

Cheat on Me may refer to:

- "Cheat on Me" (The Cribs song), 2009
- "Cheat on Me" (Burna Boy song), 2023
- "Cheat on Me", a song by Lou Reed and Metallica from Lulu, 2011
