= Tested, Approved & Trusted =

2024 song by Burna Boy

Single by Burna Boy

from the album I Told Them...
- Released: 4 April 2024
- Genre: Dancehall; Afropop; alternative hip hop
- Length: 3:40
- Label: Atlantic; Spaceship; Bad Habit
- Songwriters: Damini Ebunoluwa Ogulu; Adrian Eccleston; David Sprecher; Soraya Lapread
- Producers: Adrian X; Yeti Beats

Burna Boy singles chronology
"City Boys" (2023)	"Tested, Approved & Trusted" (2024)	"Tshwala Bam (Remix)" (2024)

Visualizer video
- "Tested, Approved & Trusted" on YouTube

"Tested, Approved & Trusted" is a song by Nigerian singer Burna Boy, released on 4 April 2024, as the sixth single from his seventh studio album, I Told Them... . It was produced by Adrian X and Yeti Beats.

== Background ==
The song originally debuted as an album track on I Told Them... on 25 August 2023. A remix with Nicki Minaj began to be teased in February 2024.

The song was re-released as a single on April 4, 2024, with a remix from Prince Swanny and a club remix from Major League DJz.

== Composition ==
African Folder's Bomi Anifowose states that the song carries "mid-tempo snare patterns and emotional instrumentation" and compares it to a classic Popcaan record. Writing for The Guardian, Alex Petridis stated that the song is reminiscent of "smooth 80s pop".

== Track listing ==
1. "Tested, Approved & Trusted" (explicit) – 3:40
2. "Tested, Approved & Trusted" (remix featuring Prince Swanny) – 3:41
3. "Tested, Approved & Trusted" (Major League DJz Mix) – 6:22

== Charts ==
Chart performance for "Tested, Approved & Trusted"
Chart (2023–24)	Peak position
France Overseas Airplay (SNEP)	14
New Zealand Hot Singles (RMNZ)	23
Suriname (Nationale Top 40)	5

== Certifications ==
Certifications for "Tested, Approved & Trusted"
Region	Certification	Certified units/sales
Canada (Music Canada)	Gold	40,000^{‡}
New Zealand (RMNZ)	Gold	15,000^{‡}
Nigeria (TCSN)	Platinum	100,000^{‡}
^{‡} Sales+streaming figures based on certification alone.
