= No Sign of Weakness =

Studio album by Burna Boy
- Released: 11 July 2025
- Recorded: 2024–2025
- Genre: Afrobeats
- Labels: Spaceship; Bad Habit; Atlantic
- Producers: Bantu; Beat Butcha; Bruce Beats; Chillz Chilleaux; Dr. Chaii; Danitello; Dre Skull; JaySynths; Major Seven; Rodaidh McDonald; MdS; Nick Bailey; Niphkeys; Otis; P2J; Stromae; Telz; Willy Will Yanez

Burna Boy chronology
I Told Them... (2023)	No Sign of Weakness (2025)

Singles from No Sign of Weakness
- 1. "Bundle by Bundle" Released: 16 December 2024; 2. "Update" Released: 18 February 2025; 3. "Sweet Love" Released: 30 April 2025; 4. "TaTaTa" Released: 21 May 2025

No Sign of Weakness is the eighth studio album by Nigerian singer Burna Boy. It was released on 11 July 2025 through Atlantic, Spaceship Records, and Bad Habit. The album features guest appearances from Travis Scott, Mick Jagger, Stromae, and Shaboozey. It was preceded by four singles: "Bundle by Bundle", "Update", and "Sweet Love", and "TaTaTa", in which the latter features Travis Scott. It serves as the follow-up to Burna Boy's previous album, I Told Them... (2023).

== Background and release ==
The album was teased in December 2024 when he released the lead single "Bundle by Bundle". Around the time, he was seen in public with Chloe Bailey, sparking dating rumors online. The album rollout continued in February 2024, when he cleared all his social media and removed himself from all his previous album covers. He also changed all his social media profile pictures to a loading icon, promising an "update" on 19 February.

== Accolades ==
Year	Awards ceremony	Award description(s)	Results	Ref
2026	The Headies	Album of the Year	Pending	
2026	The Headies	Afrobeats Album of the Year	Pending	

== Track listing ==
No Sign of Weakness track listing
No.	Title	Writer(s)	Producer(s)	Length
1.	"No Panic"	Damini Ogulu; Richard Isong	P2J	2:39
2.	"No Sign of Weakness"	Ogulu; Ronald Bean; Dennis Coles; Leigh Crizoe; Otis Millstone; Herbert Rooney; Leon Sylvers	Otis	2:56
3.	"Buy You Life"	Ogulu; Ali Odunayo	Telz	3:21
4.	"Love"	Ogulu; William Dintenfass; Andrew Hershey	Dre Skull	2:56
5.	"TaTaTa" (featuring Travis Scott)	Ogulu; Douglas Ford; Onome Ojoboh; Jacques Webster II	Chillz Chilleaux	2:30
6.	"Come Gimme"	Ogulu; Eliot Dubock; Millstone; Will Yanez	Beat Butcha; Otis; Willy Will Yanez	2:49
7.	"Dem Dey"	Ogulu; Odunayo	Telz	3:12
8.	"Sweet Love"	Ogulu; Nicole Bus; Luke Dixon; Adrian Henry; Bruce McKinnon, Jr.; Joan Reig; Joakim Toftgaard; Omar Walker; Precious Wisely	Major Seven	3:32
9.	"28 Grams"	Ogulu; Adebajo Adebanjo; Carl Henderson; Marlon Sobers; Geron Woodruffe	Niphkeys	2:14
10.	"Kabiyesi"	Ogulu; Odunayo	Telz	3:17
11.	"Empty Chairs" (featuring Mick Jagger)	Ogulu; Matt Clifford; Mick Jagger; Santeri Kauppinen; Daniel Okas	Danitello; MdS	3:13
12.	"Update"	Ogulu; Paul Hooper; Isong; Simon Law; Trevor Romeo; Caron Wheeler	P2J	3:27
13.	"Pardon" (with Stromae)	Ogulu; Paul Van Haver	Stromae	2:53
14.	"Bundle by Bundle"	Ogulu; Shane Johnson; Greg Dowling; Tracey Kelliher; Odunayo	Telz	2:56
15.	"Change Your Mind" (featuring Shaboozey)	Ogulu; Nick Bailey; Collins Chibueze; Philip Kembo; Rodaidh McDonald; Tinashe Sibanda; William Walsh; Kevin Yancey	Bantu; Dr. Chaii; Bailey; McDonald	2:29
16.	"Born Winner"	Ogulu; Chisom Onyeke	JaySynths	2:50

Notes

- The physical edition does not include "Buy You Life" and "Empty Chairs", shuffles the order of the first several tracks—moving "No Sign of Weakness" (titled "NSOW") to first, and "No Panic" to track 3—and includes a song titled "No Surrender" as track 2.

== Personnel ==
Credits adapted from Tidal.

- Burna Boy – vocals
- Jesse Ray Ernster – mixing
- Gerhard Westphalen – mastering
- Otis Millstone – engineering (1–4, 6, 8, 12, 15, 16)
- Millamix – engineering (2, 4, 5, 8–10, 16)
- Jackson Haile – mixing assistance
- Students of Chalcedony School – choir (4, 16)
- Travis Scott – featured vocals (5)
- Du-Wayne Hinds – background vocals (6)
- Emmanuel Abiola – background vocals (6)
- Evelyn Nnabuife – background vocals (6)
- Lolade Akinsiku – background vocals (6)
- Miyah McEachron – background vocals (6)
- Siobhan Omoruyi – background vocals (6)
- Nicole Bus – background vocals (8)
- Adrian "Jerks" Henry – bass (8)
- Joan Reggae Drummer – drums (8)
- Dayal Codjen – guitar (8)
- BruceBeats – horn arrangement (8)
- Luke DIxon – keyboards (8)
- Joakim Toftgaard – trombone (8)
- Jesse Ackerman – additional vocals (9)
- Mick Jagger – featured vocals (11)
- Paul Van Haver – vocals (13)
- Shaboozey – featured vocals (15)
- Rodaidh McDonald – guitar, percussion, synthesizer (15)

== Charts ==
Chart performance for No Sign of Weakness
Chart (2025)	Peak position
Australian Hip Hop/R&B Albums (ARIA)	39
Belgian Albums (Ultratop Flanders)	136
Belgian Albums (Ultratop Wallonia)	118
Canadian Albums (Billboard)	65
Dutch Albums (Album Top 100)	57
French Albums (SNEP)	58
Hungarian Physical Albums (MAHASZ)	6
Nigerian Albums (TurnTable)	1
Portuguese Albums (AFP)	66
Scottish Albums (Official Charts)	89
Swiss Albums (Schweizer Hitparade)	28
UK Albums (Official Charts)	6
UK R&B Albums (Official Charts)	1
US Billboard 200	200
US World Albums (Billboard)	3

== Release history ==
No Sign of Weakness release history
Region	Date	Format	Label	Ref.
Various	11 July 2025	CD; digital download; LP; streaming	Atlantic Records, Spaceship Records, Bad Habit	
