= Higher (Burna Boy song) =

Single by Burna Boy
- Released: 27 June 2024
- Genre: Afrobeats
- Length: 2:17
- Label: Spaceship; Bad Habit; Atlantic
- Songwriter: Damini Ebunoluwa Ogulu
- Producer: Yo Dibs

Burna Boy singles chronology
"Tshwala Bam (Remix)" (2024)	"Higher" (2024)	"We Pray" (2024)

Music video
- "Higher" on YouTube

"Higher" is a song by Nigerian singer and songwriter Burna Boy, released on 27 June 2024 through Spaceship Records, Bad Habit, and Atlantic Records. The song made history as the biggest debut for a solo song by an African on Spotify with 1.3 million streams on its first full day. "Higher" was nominated at the 67th Annual Grammy Awards for Best African Music Performance.

== Background ==
The song is dedicated to Burna Boy's hometown of Port Harcourt, where he has engaged in humanitarian work by visiting hospitals and paying the bills of the patients, and also visiting schools as part of his ongoing commitment to uplift his community through Project Protect.

== Music video ==
The music video was shot in Nigeria and was directed by Burna Boy and Asurf. It was released on 28 June 2024.

== Charts ==
Chart performance for "Higher"
Chart (2024)	Peak position
New Zealand Hot Singles (RMNZ)	32
Nigeria (TurnTable Top 100)	1
UK Singles (OCC)	99

== Certifications ==
Certifications for "Higher"
Region	Certification	Certified units/sales
Nigeria (TCSN)	4× Platinum	400,000^{‡}
^{‡} Sales+streaming figures based on certification alone.
