= Byron Messia =

Jamaican singer (born 2000)

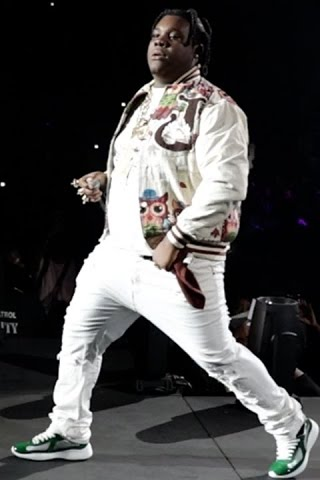
- Byron Messia at Chris Brown & Friends BZR Weekend Jamaica 2023

Background information
- Born: Dylan Byron; 10 April 2000 (age 26); Kingston, Jamaica
- Origin: Saint Kitts and Nevis
- Genres: Dancehall; Afrobeats
- Occupations: Singer; songwriter
- Years active: 2019–present
- Labels: Ztekk; Geffen; 9miles; Interscope

Dylan Byron (born 10 April 2000), known professionally as Byron Messia, is a Jamaican-Kittitian singer and songwriter. He gained mainstream recognition following the commercial release of his single "Talibans" in 2023. The song spawned a remix featuring Burna Boy, which peaked at number 99 on the US Billboard Hot 100 and received gold certification by the British Phonographic Industry (BPI).

== Early life ==
Byron Messia was born in Jamaica, but his family relocated to Saint Kitts and Nevis when he was just two months old. He developed an interest in music during his teenage years and began recording songs at the age of 15. In a statement, Messia reflected on his upbringing, acknowledging the support of his adoptive family: "I was fortunate to be adopted by a loving and caring family, who prioritized my well-being and showed me love and support. My aunts, uncles, and extended family were all instrumental in my growth and development, providing a nurturing environment that fostered my passion for music."

== Career ==
In 2019, Byron released his debut single "Living Good". It served as the lead single for his debut project Different Perspectives. He released the singles "Wait On You" and "Fantastic", the next year.

On 20 January 2023, Messia released the single "Talibans", which peaked at number 99 on the Billboard Hot 100. The song served as the lead single from his album No Love, released the same day. The song was certified gold by the British Phonographic Industry (BPI) and Music Canada (MC), denoting sales of over 400,000 units in the United Kingdom and 40,000 units in Canada, respectively. No Love, debuted at number 8 on the Billboard Reggae Albums chart.

On 25 May 2023, Messia signed a recording contract with Interscope Records. On 20 July 2023, Messia released a remix of "Talibans", renamed as "Talibans II", featuring Burna Boy. It served as the second single from Burna Boy's seventh studio album I Told Them... (2023). The remix peaked at number 39 on the New Zealand Hot Singles.

On 22 September 2023, Messia released the single "Mad Dawgs". On 7 November 2023, Messia was featured on Chris Brown's song "Nightmares". Messia followed it up with "La La" featuring Suarez in December.

On 27 March 2024, Byron released "Head Chaage", featuring Squash. A music video accompanied the single, released two days later. Messia subsequently released "Cyah Trust People" on April 19 and "Tricenarian" featuring Alkadon. On May 19, Messia was featured on Alkadon's single "Bad Bitch". Additionally, on 13 June, he released "Choppa" featuring American rapper Lil Baby, produced by Jamaican producer Rvssian and Dinay Beats.

On 11 July 2025, Byron Messia released the single track "LIVIN" in a collaboration with the Italian rapper Rondodasosa. The track is considered to be not just a hit record but a "cultural exchange" between Rondo's Italyan style and Messia's style: the track combines "Rondo’s hard-hitting Italian flow with Byron Messia’s melodic Caribbean cadence", allowing for the song to blend raw drill energy with island heat.

== Discography ==
=== Studio albums ===
| Title | Details | Peak chart positions |
| Title | Details | US Reggae |
|---|---|---|
| No Love | Release date: 20 January 2023; Label: Geffen; Format: Digital download, streaming | 8 |

=== As lead artist ===
List of singles showing year released and album name
| Title | Year | Peak chart positions | | Certifications | Album |
| Title | Year | US | NZ Hot | Certifications | Album |
|---|---|---|---|---|---|
| "Talibans" | 2023 | 99 | 39 | BPI: Gold | No Love |
| "Choppa" (with Lil Baby and Rvssian) | 2024 | — | 32 | | Non-album single |

=== As featured artist ===
List of singles showing year released and album name
| Title | Year | Peak chart positions | | Certifications | Album |
| Title | Year | UK | NZ Hot | Certifications | Album |
|---|---|---|---|---|---|
| "Nightmares" (Chris Brown featuring Byron Messia) | 2023 | 73 | 25 | | 11:11 |
