= Tshwala Bam =

2024 song by TitoM and Yuppe

Single by TitoM and Yuppe featuring S.N.E and EeQue

from the album Tshwala Bam
- Released: 23 February 2024
- Genre: Amapiano
- Length: 6:30 (single version); 4:23 (radio edit)
- Label: Africori
- Songwriters: Thato Mathobela; Bongani Sibanyoni; Snenhlanhla Ngobese; Leago Moganedi
- Producers: TitoM; Yuppe

TitoM and Yuppe singles chronology
| "Aklaleki" (2024) | "Tshwala Bam" (2024) | "Mina" (2024) |

Music video
- "Tshwala Bam" on YouTube

"Tshwala Bam" (Zulu: "My Liquor") is a song by South African record producers TitoM and Yuppe, featuring vocals from S.N.E and EeQue. The song was produced by TitoM and Yuppe, and released by Africori on 23 February 2024. The song was recorded in isiZulu, and surpassed over 100 million streams in under a month. "Tshwala Bam" spawned a remix with Nigerian singer Burna Boy which dropped on 15 May 2024.

== Background ==
According to EeQue on the Spreading Humours podcast, "Tshwala Bam" was initially recorded on a different beat in 2023 and later mixed onto the current instrumental. The song originated from vocals recorded by S.N.E for an earlier collaboration with TitoM. After an intended studio session did not take place, TitoM and Yuppe created a new beat and repurposed the existing vocals, eventually adding EeQue after several revisions of the track. S.N.E later revealed that he initially believed the vocals had been abandoned after the original song was released as an instrumental without them.

The song also gained traction through a viral dance challenge. Although snippets of "Tshwala Bam" had been uploaded to TikTok since December 2023, they attracted little attention until an unknown user paired the song with a video of the Ama Quality Boys dance group dancing to a different amapiano track. The edited video became widely shared, helping launch the dance challenge and contributing to the song's viral success. The video now has over 77,000 likes as of July 2024.

== Composition ==
The lyrics depict struggles with financial issues, peer pressure, and the temptation to use drinking as a coping mechanism. "Tshwala bam" loosely translates to "my liquor" in English. According to S.N.E, he wrote it "from the perspective of someone who abuses alcohol." "I highlight and try to relate to someone who has a drinking problem. I stay in the township so I see so many of them. And I see how much they themselves realize that alcohol is wrong for them, but they still drink it," he added.

== Music video ==
The music video for "Tshwala Bam" was released on 23 April 2024 and was directed by Kmane. The video was shot in Mamelodi, Pretoria and shows colorful scenes of adults and children dancing.

== Tshwala Bam (Remix) ==
"Tshwala Bam (Remix)"

Single by TitoM and Yuppe featuring S.N.E and Burna Boy

from the album Tshwala Bam
- Released: 15 May 2024
- Genre: Amapiano
- Length: 3:23
- Label: Africori
- Songwriters: Thato Mathobela; Bongani Sibanyoni; Snenhlanhla Ngobese; Leago Moganedi; Damini Ogulu
- Producers: TitoM; Yuppe

TitoM and Yuppe singles chronology
| "Woza La" (2024) | "Tshwala Bam (Remix)" (2024) |

Burna Boy singles chronology
| "Tested, Approved & Trusted" (2024) | "Tshwala Bam (Remix)" (2024) | "Higher" (2024) |

Music video
- "Tshwala Bam (Remix)" on YouTube

The remix of "Tshwala Bam" was released on 15 May 2024 and features Nigerian singer Burna Boy. It surpassed 100 million streams within one day of release. The music video for "Tshwala Bam (Remix)" was released on 19 May 2024 and was directed by Fedworks. It was certified triple-platinum by the TurnTable Certification System on 14 October 2024, for moving 300,000 units in Nigeria.

== Accolades ==
Awards and nominations for "Tshwala Bam"
| Organization | Year | Category | Result | Ref. |
|---|---|---|---|---|
| African Entertainment Awards USA | 2024 | Best Collaboration | Nominated | |
| African Entertainment Awards USA | 2024 | Best Music Video | Nominated | |
| African Entertainment Awards USA | 2024 | Song of the Year | Nominated | |
| Trace Awards | 2024 | Song of the Year | Won | |
| Trace Awards | 2024 | Best Collaboration | Nominated | |

== Charts ==
Weekly chart performance for "Tshwala Bam"
| Chart (2024) | Peak position |
|---|---|
| Nigeria (TurnTable Top 100) | 3 |
| South Africa Streaming (TOSAC) | 1 |
| UK Afrobeats (Official Charts) | 3 |

== Certifications ==
Certifications for "Tshwala Bam"
| Region | Certification | Certified units/sales |
|---|---|---|
| Nigeria (TCSN) Remix version | 3× Platinum | 300,000^{‡} |
^{‡} Sales+streaming figures based on certification alone.
