= I Told Them... =

Studio album by Burna Boy
- Released: 25 August 2023
- Recorded: 2022–2023
- Length: 41:35
- Languages: English; Nigerian Pidgin; Yoruba
- Labels: Spaceship; Bad Habit; Atlantic
- Producers: 255; Adrian X; Danitello; EJ Fya; Harper Gordon; Jay Blu; Kelly Blatz; Kofo; LeriQ; LiTek; MD$; Mag; Mikewavvs; Miles; Modra; Otis; P2J; Ruuben; RZA; Ashton Sellars; Skread; Spaceship Billy; Steel Banglez; Telz; Jay Weathers; WhyJay; Yeti Beats; Ztekk Records

Burna Boy chronology
Love, Damini (2022)	I Told Them... (2023)	No Sign of Weakness (2025)

Singles from I Told Them...
- 1. "Sittin' on Top of the World" Released: 23 June 2023; 2. "Talibans II" Released: 21 July 2023; 3. "Big 7" Released: 27 July 2023; 4. "Cheat on Me" Released: 22 August 2023; 5. "City Boys" Released: 22 September 2023; 6. "Tested, Approved & Trusted" Released: 4 April 2024

I Told Them... is the seventh studio album by Nigerian singer Burna Boy. It was released on 25 August 2023, through Atlantic, Spaceship Records, and Bad Habit. The album features guest appearances from 21 Savage, Dave, Seyi Vibez, J. Cole, GZA and RZA of the Wu-Tang Clan, and Byron Messia. The album was preceded by four singles, "Sittin' on Top of the World", "Talibans II", "Big 7", and "Cheat on Me".

== Background and singles ==
In support of his sixth studio album Love, Damini (2022), Ogulu embarked on a global tour starting in May 2022, with dates in North America, Europe and Africa. On 3 June 2023, he performed in front of a sold-out 60,000 crowd at the London Stadium, becoming the first African artist to headline a stadium tour in the UK. Reacting to this achievement, Ogulu first alluded to the album title, saying, "I told them that I'm a genius".

The first single "Sittin' on Top of the World" was released on 1 June 2023, supported by a remix featuring 21 Savage three weeks later. On 21 July, he shared another single titled "Talibans II" with Byron Messia. Ogulu announced the album on 27 July. The announcement was accompanied by an album trailer and the release of the single "Big 7". The song arrived with a Benny Boom-directed music video, featuring cameos by RZA, Busta Rhymes, Junior Mafia and Shameik Moore. On 22 August, Burna released the fourth single titled "Cheat on Me" featuring UK rapper Dave.

== Critical reception ==
Professional ratings
Aggregate scores
Source	Rating
Metacritic	78/100
Review scores
Source	Rating
African Folder	8.2/10
AllMusic	4/5 stars
The Arts Desk	4/5 stars
Evening Standard	4/5 stars
The Guardian	4/5 stars
The Independent	3/5 stars
NME	4/5 stars
NotJustOk	7.7/10
Pitchfork	7.8/10

I Told Them... received generally positive reviews from music critics; at review aggregator Metacritic, it received a score of 78 out of 100 based on seven critics' reviews. Betty Godson from NotJustOk noted that Burna "makes use of different sonic elements to achieve the impressive sound of the album" while stating that his "delivery is strong and charismatic." Writing for The Guardian, Alexis Petridis spoke on the album's production, noting that "[it] hones Burna Boy's sprawling influences into music that feels punchy, inimitable and impressively streamlined." Oyebanji Akins of CTDAmongblacks podcast in his review said that Burna Boy is working to bring Black Americans and Africans closer.

Ben Jolley from NME stated that "there's plenty of radio-ready gold to enjoy in the album's many singalong choruses and interesting production choices" while concluding his review by writing that the album "is not only more memorable and focused than its expansive predecessor, but it's his strongest album yet." The Independent's Helen Brown stated that the album is "richly and lovingly crafted, with easygoing mix of Afro-pop, rap and R&B, loaded with texture and pleasant melody, all held together by Ogulu's appealing voice.

Writing for Pitchfork, Julianne Escobedo Shepherd wrote that the album "is succinct and grand as an opening salvo, which explores the '90s U.S. hip-hop he grew up loving, preemptively hedging scepticism."

=== Year-end lists ===
Select year-end rankings of I Told Them...
Publication	List	Rank	Ref.
Rolling Stone	The 100 Best Albums of 2023	71	
Time Out	The 30 best albums of 2023	6	

== Commercial performance ==
I Told Them... debuted at number one on the UK Albums Chart, selling 14,164 album-equivalent units in the first week, becoming Burna Boy's first number-one album. Becoming the first number one album ever on the chart by an African artist. Singles "Sittin' on Top of the World", "Big 7", and three other songs for the album charted on the UK Singles Chart: "Sittin' on Top of the World" (36), "Big 7" (53), "Cheat on Me" (19) and "City Boys" (14). UK chart rules prevent artists from having more than three songs in the top 40 at once, otherwise, Burna Boy's album would have generated further new entries in the countdown.

The album also debuted at number 31 in the US after selling 21,000 copies in the country in its first week.

== Track listing ==
I Told Them... track listing
No.	Title	Writer(s)	Producer(s)	Length
1.	"I Told Them" (featuring GZA)	Damini Ebunoluwa Ogulu; Gary Grice; Alli Odunayo; Harper Gordon; Kevin Ekofo	Gordon; Kofo; Telz	3:09
2.	"Normal"	Ogulu; Marco Daniel Borrero	Mag	2:04
3.	"On Form"	Ogulu; Ashton Sellers; Richard Isong	P2J; Sellers^{[a]}	3:42
4.	"Sittin' on Top of the World" (featuring 21 Savage)	Ogulu; Shayaa Bin Abraham-Joseph; Fred Jerkins III; Isaac Phillips; LaShawn Daniels; Mason Betha; Matthieu Le Carpentier; Nycolia "Tye-V" Turman; Rodney Jerkins; Traci Hale	Skread	3:08
5.	"Tested, Approved & Trusted"	Ogulu; Adrian Eccleston; David Sprecher; Soraya Lapread	Adrian X; Yeti Beats	3:40
6.	"Cheat on Me" (featuring Dave)	Ogulu; David Orobosa Omoregie; Jimmy Napier; Kwabena Sarkodee Adjepong; Taras Slusarenko	LiTek; WhyJay; Jay Blu	3:42
7.	"Virgil"	Ogulu; Virgil Abloh	Danitello; MD$	1:07
8.	"Big 7"	Ogulu; Santeri Kauppinen; Miles; Otis Millstone; Daniel Okas; Michael Washington Jr.	Danitello; MD$; Mikewavvs; Otis; Miles	2:23
9.	"Dey Play"	Ogulu; Charles Malo Josek; Eric Isaac Utere; Guy Solomon Josek; Louis Amon Josek	255; LeriQ	2:33
10.	"City Boys"	Ogulu; Jeremy Felton; Keith Eric James; Michael Abram Schultz; Robert Laukkanen; Santeri Kauppinen	MD$; Ruuben	2:33
11.	"Giza" (featuring Seyi Vibez)	Ogulu; Loseyi Balogun; Olanite Olaoluwa Elijah	Modra	2:59
12.	"12 Jewels" (featuring RZA)	Robert Fitzgerald Diggs	RZA	0:27
13.	"If I'm Lying"	Ogulu; Pahuldip Singh Sandhu	Steel Banglez	3:17
14.	"Thanks" (featuring J. Cole)	Ogulu; Jermaine Cole; Ashton Sellars; Jonathan Lee; Ras Kassa Alexander	Sellars; Jay Weathers	3:36
15.	"Talibans II" (with Byron Messia)	Ogulu; Byron Messia; Onugba Enojo Paul	EJ Fya; Spaceship Billy; Ztekk Records	2:56
Total length:				41:35

Notes

- ^{^[a]} signifies an additional producer.
- "Sittin' on Top of the World" contains a sample of "Top of the World" (1998), written by LaShawn Daniels, Fred Jerkins III, Rodney Jerkins, Isaac Phillips, Nycolia "Tye-V" Turman and Mason Betha, as performed by Brandy featuring Mase.

== Personnel ==
- Burna Boy – vocals
- Gerhard Westphalen – mastering
- Jesse Ray Ernster – mixing
- Otis Millstone – engineering
- Andrea Mastro – recording (track 1)
- Eric Isaac Utere – recording (4)
- GZA – additional vocals (1)
- Ashton Sellars – guitar (3)
- Ife Ogunjobi – trumpet (3)
- Nadia Simon – trumpet (3)
- Virgil Abloh – vocals (7)

== Charts ==
Chart performance for I Told Them...
Chart (2023)	Peak position
Australian Albums (ARIA)	56
Australian Hip Hop/R&B Albums (ARIA)	14
Austrian Albums (Ö3 Austria)	39
Belgian Albums (Ultratop Flanders)	20
Belgian Albums (Ultratop Wallonia)	11
Canadian Albums (Billboard)	18
Danish Albums (Hitlisten)	13
Dutch Albums (Album Top 100)	2
French Albums (SNEP)	6
German Albums (Offizielle Top 100)	46
Irish Albums (Official Charts)	25
New Zealand Albums (RMNZ)	12
Nigeria Albums (TurnTable)	1
Norwegian Albums (VG-lista)	6
Swedish Albums (Sverigetopplistan)	7
Swiss Albums (Schweizer Hitparade)	7
UK Albums (Official Charts)	1
UK R&B Albums (Official Charts)	1
US Billboard 200	31
US World Albums (Billboard)	2

== Certifications ==
Certifications for I Told Them...
Region	Certification	Certified units/sales
Canada (Music Canada)	Gold	40,000^{‡}
New Zealand (RMNZ)	Gold	7,500^{‡}
Nigeria (TCSN)	3× Platinum	150,000^{‡}
United Kingdom (BPI)	Gold	100,000^{‡}
^{‡} Sales+streaming figures based on certification alone.
