= DJDS =

Los Angeles hip hop duo

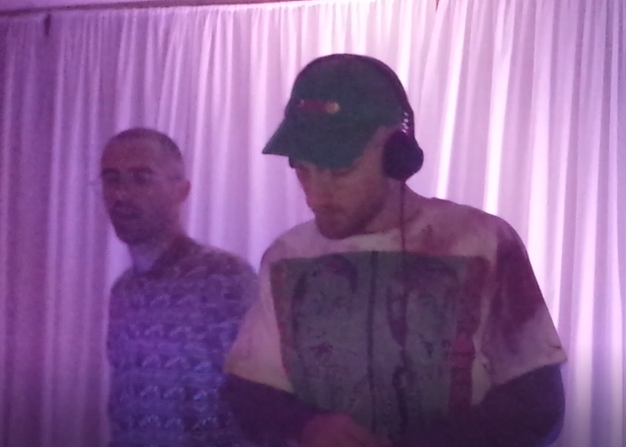
DJDS at the Santa Teresa Festival in Québec in 2018

DJDS (formerly DJ Dodger Stadium) is an American production and DJ duo consisting of Jerome LOL (Jerome Potter) and Samo Sound Boy (Sam Griesemer), based in Los Angeles.

== Members ==
Griesemer was born in Manhattan, New York and grew up in New Hampshire. He made his production debut in September 2010 with Taking It All, an EP for New York-based record label Palms Out Sounds.

Potter is from Los Angeles, and previously released music as part of duo LOL Boys. He has also recorded music under the name Wooly Wally and has released music through his own label, Jerry's Jams.

== History ==
In 2011, the pair founded the record label Body High, releasing their first EP Stadium Status on the label in October 2011. In July 2014, they released their debut album Friend of Mine on the label. The album received praise from Pitchfork Magazine, earning an 8.0 score. Other artists on the Body High roster include DJ Funeral, DJ Sliink, Jim-E Stack, Todd Edwards, Myrryrs, and Floyd Campbell.

In 2015, they signed to Loma Vista Recordings and released their second album, Stand Up And Speak, in January the following year, also on Body High. They followed up the album with a remixed version of the lead single "You Don't Have To Be Alone", featuring new vocals from Charlie Wilson, former lead singer of The Gap Band.

During this period, Griesemer also released three solo EPs through Body High as Samo Sound Boy – the 5 Dollar Paradise EP in September 2012, the Your Love EP in October 2013, and "Open / Divine" in March 2014. The EPs received positive coverage from Pitchfork and The FADER.

DJDS provided production to Kanye West's 2016 album The Life of Pablo, working on the songs "Ultralight Beam", "Fade", "Father Stretch Pt. 1", "Freestyle 4", and "Low Lights". They received a "Best Rap Song" Grammy nomination for "Ultralight Beam".

They produced the song "Rih-Flex" on The-Dream's 2016 EP Love You To Death.

In February 2017, DJDS soundtracked Kanye West's "Yeezy Season 5" fashion show, producing a 17-minute extended version of the song "Bed" featuring The-Dream.

DJDS produced the song "Another Sad Love Song" on recording artist Khalid's debut album, American Teen, released March 2017. The album debuted at #9 on the Billboard 200 chart.

In July 2017, DJDS released the song "Trees on Fire" featuring Amber Mark and Marco McKinnis. It was named "Best New Track" by Pitchfork.

In August 2017, DJDS released their single "Why Don't You Come On" featuring Khalid and Empress Of. In March 2018, they released the single "No Pain" featuring Khalid, Charlie Wilson, and Charlotte Day Wilson.

In May 2018, DJDS released their third studio album, Big Wave More Fire.

They released a surprise four-song EP with Burna Boy, on 21 March 2019, called Steel & Copper.

Their remix of Interpol's "The Rover" was featured on MLB The Show 19's official soundtrack.

== Discography ==
=== Albums ===
- Friend of Mine – (2014/Body High) – as DJ Dodger Stadium
- Begging Please – (2015/Body High)
- Stand Up And Speak – (2016/Loma Vista) – as DJDS
- Big Wave More Fire – (2018) – as DJDS

=== EPs ===
- Taking It All (2010/Palms Out Sounds) – Samo Sound Boy
- Shuffle Code (2011/Trouble & Bass) – Samo Sound Boy
- Stadium Status (2011/Body High) – as DJ Dodger Stadium
- 5 Dollar Paradise (2012/Body High) – Samo Sound Boy
- Your Love (2013/Body High) – Samo Sound Boy
- "Open / Divine" (2014/Body High) – Samo Sound Boy
- Steel & Copper (with Burna Boy) (2019)

=== Charted singles ===
Title	Year	Peak chart positions
Title	Year	US Dance
"Why Don't You Come On" (featuring Khalid and Empress Of)	2017	30
