= Jesse Ray Ernster =

Mixing engineer, audio engineer, and record producer

- Born: Winnipeg, Manitoba, Canada
- Origin: Minneapolis, Minnesota, U.S.
- Genres: Hip hop; pop; rock
- Occupations: Mixing engineer; audio engineer; record producer
- Labels: Bad Habit; GOOD; Def Jam; Atlantic
- Website: jesseraymix.com

Jesse Ray Ernster is a Grammy Award-winning Canadian-born American mixing engineer, audio engineer, and record producer, based in Los Angeles. He has worked with artists including Kanye West, Megan Thee Stallion, Becky G, Burna Boy, Doja Cat, Arcy Drive, Ingrid Michaelson, and Goody Grace.

Ernster mixed Doja Cat's top 10 hit, Woman (Doja Cat song) and has earned one win at the Grammy Awards for his contributions to the album Twice as Tall by Burna Boy.
