= On and On (Tyla song) =

Promotional single by Tyla

from the album Tyla
- Released: 30 November 2023
- Genre: R&B
- Length: 2:47
- Label: Fax; Epic
- Songwriters: Tyla Seethal; Corey Marlon Lindsay-Keay
- Producer: Believve

Live version
- "On and On" (A COLORS SHOW) on YouTube

Official audio
- "On and On" on YouTube

"On and On" is a song by South African singer Tyla from her debut studio album Tyla (2024). A live version of the song was released via music performance platform ColorsxStudios to YouTube and all digital platforms on 30 November 2023. The official version was released a day later alongside two other tracks, through Fax and Epic Records.

== Composition ==
"On and On" is an R&B song characterized by Tyla's "old school" vocals, its "danceable" rhythms and "ethereal" instrumental. Joel Ontong, a contemporary music critic at News24, described it as "a great song to just groove to; the subdued atmosphere makes for an intimate experience, heightened by Tyla's luscious vocal performance."

== Live performances ==
Tyla first performed the song on German music performance platform ColorsxStudios, with the video premiering a day before the release of the song on 30 November 2023. She also performed the song in a medley with "Truth or Dare" and "Water" during the 2024 Dick Clark's New Year's Rockin' Eve television special.

== Credits and personnel ==
- Tyla – songwriting, vocals, background vocals, additional vocals
- Believve – songwriting, background vocals, additional vocals, production, vocal production, engineering
- Ebenezer Maxwell – additional vocal production
- Leandro "Dro" Hidalgo – mixing
- Colin Leonard – mastering

== Charts ==
Chart performance for "On and On"
Chart (2023)	Peak position
UK Afrobeats (OCC)	16
US Afrobeats Songs (Billboard)	10
