= Steel & Copper =

EP by Burna Boy and DJDS
- Released: March 21, 2019
- Recorded: 2019
- Genre: Afropop; trap; dancehall; reggae
- Length: 10:00
- Label: Spaceship; Bad Habit; Atlantic; Loma Vista
- Producer: DJDS

Burna Boy chronology
Outside (2018)	Steel & Copper (2019)	African Giant (2019)

DJDS chronology
Big Wave More Fire (2018)	Steel & Copper (2019)

Steel & Copper is a collaborative extended play by Nigerian singer Burna Boy and American production duo DJDS. The EP comprises four tracks and was released on March 21, 2019, through Spaceship Entertainment, Bad Habit, Atlantic Records and Loma Vista Recordings. It is the follow-up to Burna Boy's third studio album, Outside (2018), and DJDS' fourth studio album, Big Wave More Fire (2018). Steel & Copper blends Burna Boy’s upbeat melodies with DJDS' slinky trap beats.

== Composition ==
Steel & Copper is a dancehall, reggae, afropop, and trap album. The title track, "34", is a reference to Giannis Antetokounmpo's jersey number; the song first appeared in a freestyle Burna Boy did for Link Up TV's Behind the Barz. In "Innocent Man", Burna Boy transitions from lyrical flows to fast-paced rapping and discusses survival in the cold. In the Rastafarian-influenced track "Darko", he complains about the authorities and explains why he doesn't care what people think of him; the song pays homage to his 2014 hit "Don Gorgon" and opens with a lively piano tone. In "Thuggin", Burna Boy tells the story of surviving life in spite of all the people he has lost; the song features a guitar-driven R&B beat and is evocative of worship music. Ehis Ohunyon of Pulse Nigeria praised the song's structure and content.

== Releases ==
The video for "Thuggin/Darko", a merger of the songs "Thuggin" and "Darko", was released on April 1, 2019. It was directed by Daniel Regan and features styling from Nigerian fashion photographer Stephen Tayo. The video contains spiritual elements and is a depiction of life and death. It also includes heartbreaking scenes in which Burna Boy tends to a mother before engaging in a deadly street fight with another man.

== Critical reception ==
Professional ratings
Review scores
Source	Rating
The Spill Magazine	4/5 stars
Pulse Nigeria	3/5 stars

Steel & Copper received generally positive reviews from music critics. Pulse Nigeria's Ehis Ohunyon awarded the EP 3 stars out of 5, saying it "succeeds through sheer force of will, cutting edge style and his simple approach to achieving excellence". In contrast, Ohunyon criticized its length and said it "lacks the gusto to leave a memorable mark in the mind of listeners". The Native's Debola Abimbolu said Steel & Copper is a continuation of the "genre-bending antics" that DJDS explored on their 2018 album Big Wave More Fire; Abimbolu also commended Burna Boy for helping the duo delve into Afropop.

Spill Magazine's Adam Nosalik granted the EP 4 stars out of 5, commending it for being a well put-together project. Notiki Bello of Filter Free Nigeria called the EP "smooth" and said "there is no noticeable sonic glitch in any of the songs".

== Track listing ==
No.	Title	Writer(s)	Producer(s)	Length
1.	"34"	Damini Ogulu	DJDS	2:40
2.	"Innocent Man"	Ogulu	DJDS	2:30
3.	"Darko"	Ogulu	DJDS	2:02
4.	"Thuggin"	Ogulu	DJDS	3:44
Total length:				10:00

== Release history ==
Region	Date	Format	Version	Label
Various	March 21, 2019	Digital download	Standard	Spaceship; Bad Habit; Atlantic; Loma Vista Recordings
