= Talibans (song) =

Song by Byron Messia

- Cover art for the official remix

Single by Byron Messia

from the album No Love
- Released: July 20, 2023
- Genre: Dancehall
- Length: 3:08
- Label: Ztekk
- Songwriters: Dylan Byron; Onugba Enojo Paul
- Producers: Kelly Beatz; Ej Fya; Spaceship Billy

Byron Messia singles chronology
"I Hate Byron" (2023)	"Talibans" (2023)	"Tropicana" (2023)

Burna Boy singles chronology
"Masculine" (2023)	"Talibans II" (2023)	"Big 7" (2023)

Music video
- "Talibans" on YouTube
- "Talibans II" on YouTube

"Talibans" is a song by Jamaican recording artist Byron Messia, released on January 20, 2023, from his debut studio album No Love. Considered his breakout song, it went viral in early 2023. An official remix of the song titled "Talibans II" with Nigerian singer Burna Boy was released on July 20, 2023.

== Background ==
Byron Messia has explained that "Talibans" is "more of a warning song", and "It's not a crime organization song, it's more like telling somebody 'If you want, we can get down like how di people dem in Afghanistan get down' song." He added, "In the making of 'Taliban', it wasn't even something serious. I never wrote down the lyrics for Taliban. It's based on pure inside jokes".

== Composition ==
The production of the song includes syncopated percussion and "atmospheric" synth pads.

== Critical reception ==
Brandon Callender of The Fader wrote that in the song Byron Messia "oscillates between sinking into the song's deep groove and spotlighting his resonant vibrato. His vocal control makes me think of how artists like NoCap switch from tough-talking raps to full-blown yelps seemingly without warning."

== Music video ==
A music video for the song was directed by Ty Lott and Neatz Films. It contains a wide presence of guns and a murder is simulated toward the end.

== Remix ==
The official remix of the song, released on July 20, 2023, is a collaboration with Burna Boy and the second single from his seventh studio album I Told Them... (2023). It features a new verse from Byron Messia, in which he brags about his relationship with Jamaican singer Jada Kingdom.

=== Critical reception ===
The remix was well received by music critics. Wongo Okon of Uproxx commented, "The remix begins with a strong entrance from Burna before Byron returns with his original verse." Gabriel Bras Nevares of HotNewHipHop wrote of the production, "Of course, it may sound sparse at first glance, but it actually creates special emphasis on the performers here for them to lead 'Talibans II' to its peaks." Nevares further wrote, "Burna Boy and Byron Messia are in top form here, flowing with ease, confidence, and charisma through their melodic verses and refrains. While the lyrical matter here ranges from boastful to threatening, the sonic pallet keeps things chilled out, and their voices inject passion into the song."

=== Music video ===
The music video premiered alongside the single. Filmed in Jamaica, it finds Byron Messia and Burna Boy hanging out at a resort by the beach, a tennis court and golf course.

== Charts ==
Chart performance for "Talibans II"
Chart (2023)	Peak position
Canada Hot 100 (Billboard)	53
New Zealand Hot Singles (RMNZ)	39
US Billboard Hot 100	99
UK Hip Hop/R&B (OCC)	20

== Certifications ==
Certifications for "Talibans"
Region	Certification	Certified units/sales
Canada (Music Canada)	Gold	40,000^{‡}
United Kingdom (BPI)	Gold	400,000^{‡}
^{‡} Sales+streaming figures based on certification alone.

== Certifications ==
Certifications for "Talibans II"
Region	Certification	Certified units/sales
Canada (Music Canada)	Gold	40,000^{‡}
Nigeria (TCSN)	Platinum	100,000^{‡}
^{‡} Sales+streaming figures based on certification alone.
