= LeriQ =

- Born: Eric Isaac Utere; Rivers State, Nigeria
- Origin: Akwa Ibom, Nigeria
- Genres: Pop music, R&B, Afro pop music, African hip hop
- Occupations: Record producer, songwriter
- Years active: 2012–present
- Labels: Spaceship Records (current); Aristokrat Records (formal); Sony Music Africa (formal)

Eric Isaac Utere, known professionally as LeriQ, is a Nigerian record producer and songwriter. He is currently signed to Spaceship Records, through Spaceship Collective. He achieved recognition for his work on Burna Boy's 2012 single Like To Party, and went on to produce the singer's debut album L.I.F.E (2013), and Twice as Tall (2020), which earned him an award at the 63rd Grammy ceremony.

== Early life and career ==
LeriQ is the firstborn of a family of six boys, born in Rivers State but hails from Akwa Ibom State in the southern part of Nigeria. LeriQ Started producing at the age of 13, citing his love for art, his love for musical sounds and the influence of his Dad, a renowned stage designer and artist and his brothers, one a video director and another a singer/dancer. LeriQ signed a deal with Sony Music Africa in July 2015, and signed a production deal with Spaceship Records, through Spaceship Collective.

LeriQ released a producer album in 2015, titled The Lost Sounds. The album featured artistes such as Illbliss, Chidimma, Burna Boy, Dammy Krane, Cassper Nyovest, Wande Coal, Seyi Shay, Wizkid, Phyno, Nneka, 2face Idibia, Efya, Bez, Naeto C and Timaya. In September, 2016 LeriQ teamed up with Burna Boy to produce Burna Boy new extended play titled "Redemption", a self produced project by LeriQ, after Burna Boy debut L.I.F.E, he self produced in 2013 before they both the reunion, to produce "Redemption".

== Production discography ==
Singles produced

- Burna Boy
1. "Like to Party"
2. "Tonight"
3. "Always Love You"
4. "Run My Race"
5. "Pree Me"
6. "Fa So LaTi Do"
7. "Boshe Nlo"
8. "Mary Jane"
9. "Body to Body #YCD"
10. "Plenty Song"
11. "We On"
12. "Way Too Big"
13. "No Fit Vex"
- The Lost Sounds
1. "Where You Dey (feat. Illbliss, Chidimma & OZone)"
2. "Multiply (feat. LOS & Kamar Tachio)"
3. "Comment Tu T'Appelle (feat. Burna Boy, Dammy Krane, Mojeed & OZone)"
4. "Hell of It (feat. Kayswitch & Cassper Nyovest)"
5. "Wish List (feat. Wande Coal)"
6. "XtaSy (feat. Seyi Shay)"
7. "All I Need (feat. Redsan & Shaydee)"
8. "Say You Love Me (feat. Wizkid)"
9. "Turn Up (feat. Burna Boy & Phyno)"
10. "Stand Still (feat. Nneka)"
11. "Answers (feat. 2Face Idibia)"
12. "Show Me (feat. Efya)"
13. "Let You Go (feat. Wurld)"
14. "Let Me Love You (feat. BeZ & Mojeed)"
15. "Nagode (feat. Naeto C & Kamar Tachio)"
16. "Easy Thing (feat. Trigga Mad Tonic)"
17. "Aunty (feat. Timaya)"
18. "Lataba (feat. Pucado)"
19. "Peace (feat. Timi Kay & Aina More)"
20. "Smell of Success (feat. Show Dem Camp, Suté & Tay)"

=== LeriQ singles ===
Title	Year	Album	Release date
"Comment Tu T’appelle" (LeriQ) featuring (Burna Boy, Dammy Krane, Ozone and Mojeed)	2014	The Lost Sound	28 August 2015
"Turn up" (LeriQ) featuring (Burna Boy and Phyno)	2014	The Lost Sound	28 August 2015
"Say you love me" (LeriQ) featuring (Wizkid)	2015	The Lost Sound	28 August 2015
"I Like It" (LeriQ) featuring (Shaydee)	2015		
"Cotton Candy" (LeriQ & DJ Tunez) featuring (Burna Boy)	2017		
"Start All Over" (LeriQ) featuring (Odunsi (The Engine) )	2018		

=== LeriQ albums ===
Title	Release date
The Lost Sounds	28 August 2015

== Awards ==
Year	Awards ceremony	Award description(s)	Results
2013	The Headies	Producer of the Year (for the song "Like to Party")	Nominated
2015	The Headies	Best R&B Single (for the song "Say You Love Me" - LeriQ (featuring Wizkid))	Nominated
2021	Grammy Awards	Best Global Music Album ("Twice as Tall " - Burna Boy)	Won
