= L.I.F.E =

Studio album by Burna Boy
- Released: August 12, 2013
- Genres: Afrobeat; ragga; dancehall; fuji
- Length: 59:00 (standard edition); 63:05 (deluxe edition)
- Languages: English; Nigerian Pidgin; Yoruba
- Label: Aristokrat
- Producer: Leriq

Burna Boy chronology
Burn Identity (2011)	L.I.F.E (2013)	On a Spaceship (2015)

Deluxe edition cover

Singles from L.I.F.E
- 1. "Like to Party" Released: May 30, 2012; 2. "Tonight" Released: September 24, 2012; 3. "Always Love You" Released: March 6, 2013; 4. "Run My Race" Released: March 11, 2013; 5. "Yawa Dey" Released: August 5, 2013

L.I.F.E (an acronym for Leaving an Impact for Eternity) is the debut studio album by Nigerian singer Burna Boy. It was released on August 12, 2013, by Aristokrat Records. The album serves as the follow-up to his second mixtape, Burn Identity (2011), and sold 40,000 copies on the first day of its release. Aristokrat Records later sold the album's marketing rights to Uba Pacific for ₦10 million. L.I.F.E was supported by the singles "Like to Party", "Tonight", "Always Love You", "Run My Race" and "Yawa Dey". The album was produced entirely by Leriq and features guest appearances from 2face Idibia, M.I, Timaya, Olamide, Reminisce and Wizkid.

Nigerian Entertainment Today ranked L.I.F.E 10th on its list of the 12th Best Albums of 2013. The album's music draws heavily from the music of Fela Kuti, King Sunny Ade and Bob Marley. L.I.F.E received generally positive reviews from music critics, who applauded its production. It was nominated for Best Album of the Year at the 2014 Nigeria Entertainment Awards, and peaked at number 7 on the Billboard Reggae Albums chart in August 2013.

== Background and promotion ==
L.I.F.E was mixed and mastered by Leriq at Solid Sound Studios in Ikota, Lagos. In an interview with BellaNaija, Burna Boy said he named the album L.I.F.E in order to leave a lasting impact and showcase the realism of his life. In another interview with Toolz on NdaniTV, he described the album as a journey through life. On July 17, 2013, Aristokrat Records unveiled the album's cover art to the general public. Peedi Picasso designed the cover art for both the standard and deluxe edition. Burna Boy shares the cover art with Fela Kuti, King, Sunny Ade and Bob Marley. In a press release, the record label said L.I.F.E would be released in three installments (street, original and deluxe) and that its release would be accompanied by a release party, CD signatures and a tour. In August 2013, Burna Boy held an album listening party at Cafe Vanessa in Victoria Island. In September 2013, he launched a concert titled "The Burna Boy Experience" to promote the album in the cities of Accra and Sekondi-Takoradi. L.I.F.E was released in Nigeria and reportedly sold 40,000 copies on the first day of its release. The marketing rights for the album were later sold to Uba Pacific for ₦10 million.

The album's lead single, "Like to Party", was released on May 30, 2012. The music video for the song was filmed in Lagos by Adasa Cookey. On September 24, 2012, Burna Boy released the album's second single "Tonight", which was recorded in English, Yoruba and Igbo. The music video for "Tonight" was directed by Mex and uploaded to YouTube at a total length of 4 minutes and 4 seconds. It was nominated for Most Gifted Newcomer Video at the 2013 Channel O Music Video Awards. The album's third single, "Always Love You", was released on March 6, 2013; it is a pop song with elements of house and dance music. "Run My Race", which was recorded in English, Yoruba, and Nigerian Pidgin, serves as the album's fourth single. The music video for "Run My Race" was recorded by Clarence Peters at the New Afrika Shrine. The album's fifth single, "Yawa Dey", was released on August 5, 2013. Its music video was also directed by Peters and features various light-hearted scenes of posse dancing and beach soccer. A hyperrealist color scheme was used to shoot the video.

== Composition ==
L.I.F.E is a ragga, dancehall, afrobeat and fuji album, which draws heavily from the music of Fela Anikulapo Kuti, King Sunny Ade and Bob Marley. "No No No" is a fusion of the aforementioned genres. The groovy highlife track "Say So" contains a saxophone riff. "Na so E Suppose Be" is an ode to the coolness of 1990s music. "Yawa Dey" is a tribute to the galala sound of several ragga artists from Ajegunle, including Daddy Showkey and Baba Fryo. In "Run My Race", Burna Boy impersonates Fela Kuti over an electro-Afrobeat instrumental.

In "Boom Boom Boom", he samples a line from Fela Kuti's "Army Arrangement". The hook of "Smooth Sailing" consists of a Yoruba fairy tale. On the closing track "Outro: Remember Me", Burna Boy reiterates the album's themes to listeners.

== Reception ==
=== Critical reception ===
Professional ratings
Review scores
Source	Rating
Hip Hop World Magazine	4/5 stars
Jaguda.com	8.5/10
Nigerian Entertainment Today	3.5/5 stars

L.I.F.E received positive reviews from music critics. Reviewing for Nigerian Entertainment Today, Ayomide Tayo praised the album's production and commended Leriq for not making it sound repetitive. In contrast, Tayo said the record "lacks a knock out hit to seal the stateliness." Wilfred Okiche of YNaija said the album "avoids the pitfalls of monotony and boredom that could easily have befallen the disc but the overall sound is still a tad unsatisfying, like there is stuff Burna Boy is holding back."

Writing for the website Jaguda.com, Ayo Alloh rated the album 8.5 out of 10, saying it was never monotonous despite being solely produced. In a review for Hip Hop World Magazine, Enemigin Neye awarded the album 4 stars out of 5, acknowledging it for "showing the everyday improvement in the sound called Nigerian music". Neye "believes Burna Boy is here to stay and believes the album is definitely one to remember."

=== Accolades ===
L.I.F.E was nominated for Best Album of the Year at the 2014 Nigeria Entertainment Awards. The album was also nominated for Best R&B/Pop Album and Album of the Year at The Headies 2014.

== Track listing ==
No.	Title	Writer(s)	Producer(s)	Length
1.	"Intro: My Life"	Damini Ogulu	Leriq	3:14
2.	"No No No"	Ogulu	Leriq	2:37
3.	"Say So"	Ogulu	Leriq	4:36
4.	"Abeg Abeg (Remix)" (featuring 2face Idibia and Timaya)	Ogulu; Innocent Idibia; Enetimi Odom	Leriq	3:32
5.	"Na so E Suppose Be"	Ogulu	Leriq	4:16
6.	"Run My Race"	Ogulu	Leriq	4:14
7.	"Boom Boom Boom"	Ogulu	Leriq	3:50
8.	"#Yawadey"	Ogulu	Leriq	3:57
9.	"Ma Loda Ma Motto"	Ogulu	Leriq	3:04
10.	"Tonight"	Ogulu	Leriq	4:10
11.	"Like to Party"	Ogulu	Leriq	4:09
12.	"Smooth Sailing"	Ogulu	Leriq	4:06
13.	"Don't Run" (featuring Reminisce and Olamide)	Ogulu; Olamide Adedeji; Remilekun Safaru	Leriq	3:22
14.	"Jahs Love Is True" (featuring Wizkid)	Ogulu; Ayodeji Balogun	Leriq	4:09
15.	"Outro: Remember Me"	Ogulu	Leriq	3:40
Total length:				59:00

Bonus track
No.	Title	Writer(s)	Producer(s)	Length
16.	"Wombolombo Something"	Ogulu	Leriq	3:24

Deluxe edition
No.	Title	Writer(s)	Producer(s)	Length
17.	"Always Love You"	Ogulu	Leriq	4:23
18.	"My Cry" (featuring M.I)	Ogulu; Jude Abaga	Leriq	3:55
19.	"Guilty"	Ogulu	Leriq	3:36
20.	"Dem No Know"	Ogulu	Leriq	3:48
Total length:				63:05

Notes

- Leriq performed additional vocals on "Intro: My Life", "My Cry", and "Like to Party"
- Simon Okechukwu performed additional vocals on "Guilty"
- Paul "Pucado" Orisakwe performed additional vocals on "Ma Loda Ma Motto"

Sample credits

- "Boom Boom Boom" samples a line from Fela Kuti's "Army Arrangement".

== Personnel ==
- Damini "Burna Boy" Ogulu – primary artist, writer, performer
- Eric "Leriq" Utere – producer, instrumentation, engineer, production co-ordination, mixing, mastering, background vocals
- Enetimi Odom – featured artist, writer
- Innocent Idibia – featured artist, writer
- Olamide Adedeji – featured artist, writer
- Remilekun Safaru – featured artist, writer
- Jude Abaga – featured artist, writer
- Simon Okechukwu – background vocals, guitar
- Paul "Pucado" Orisakwe – background vocals
- Josiah – Saxophone
- Maria Okarende – Voice tags
- Piriye "Peedi Picasso" Isokrari – executive producer, management, album art direction

== Charts ==
Chart (2013)	Peak position
US Reggae Albums (Billboard)	7

== Release history ==
Country/Digital platform	Date	Version	Format	Label
Nigeria; iTunes	August 12, 2013	Standard	CD; digital download	Aristokrat Records
