= Sittin' on Top of the World (Burna Boy song) =

2023 single by Burna Boy

Single by Burna Boy

from the album I Told Them...
- Released: 1 June 2023
- Length: 2:39
- Label: Atlantic; Spaceship; Bad Habit
- Songwriters: Damini Ebunoluwa Ogulu; Fred Jerkins III; Isaac Phillips; LaShawn Daniels; Mason Betha; Matthieu Le Carpentier; Nycolia "Tye-V" Turman; Rodney Jerkins; Traci Hale
- Producer: Skread

Burna Boy singles chronology
| "Mera Na" (2023) | "Sittin' on Top of the World" (2023) | "Sittin' on Top of the World (Remix)" (2023) |

Music video
- "Sittin' on Top of the World (feat. 21 Savage)" on YouTube

Remix cover
- Cover art of the official remix featuring 21 Savage.

"Sittin' on Top of the World" is a song by Nigerian singer Burna Boy, released on 1 June 2023 as the lead single from his seventh studio album I Told Them... (2023). Produced by Skread, it contains a sample of "Top of the World" by Brandy featuring Mase. An official remix of the song featuring Atlanta-based rapper 21 Savage was released on 23 June 2023.

The remix received a nomination for Best Melodic Rap Performance at the 66th Annual Grammy Awards. Burna Boy performed the song at the ceremony on February 4, 2024, alongside Brandy and 21 Savage.

== Background ==
On 26 May 2023, Burna Boy teased the song with a clip of him playing it for American rapper RZA on social media. The song was also released alongside a lyric video.

== Composition ==
The song heavily samples "Top of the World"; it is a departure from Burna Boy's signature afrobeats style, featuring a fusion of old-school hip hop, R&B and pop elements. Lyrically, it finds Burna Boy promising to share the riches and luxuries from his success with a special woman in his life.

== Remix ==
The official remix features 21 Savage and was released on 23 June 2023, having previously been leaked online. It adds a guest verse from 21 Savage, who raps about wealth, women and success. Alexander Cole of HotNewHipHop gave a positive review of the remix, stating "The vibe of this track is truly undeniable. If you have been following Burna Boy and his career, then you know his vibe is simply immaculate. He is always bringing out the best in himself and the artists around him. Consequently, 21 Savage was able to feed off of that and turn in a verse that will turn some heads. Additionally, the production here is amazing as the Ma$e sample will have people coming back for more. It's a collab that not everyone expected, but it certainly worked out in the end."

=== Music video ===
A music video for the remix was directed by Troy Roscoe and premiered on 26 June 2023. It shows shots of Burna Boy taking pictures with friends in a photo booth, at a rooftop dance party with classic cars (where he is seen rocking an Avirex jacket, baggy jeans, Timbs and his hat to the back and hanging out of a lowrider at one point), Through special effects, Burna Boy is also seen in outer space with a lover, on a vertical highway, and gracing the covers of multiple magazines. 21 Savage appears rapping in a stark white background.

== Charts ==
=== Weekly charts ===
Chart performance for "Sittin' on Top of the World"
| Chart (2023) | Peak position |
|---|---|
| Netherlands (Single Top 100) | 98 |
| New Zealand (Recorded Music NZ) | 36 |
| Nigeria (TurnTable Top 100) | 8 |
| UK Singles (Official Charts) | 36 |
| UK Afrobeats (Official Charts) | 1 |
| UK Hip Hop/R&B (Official Charts) | 15 |
| US Billboard Hot 100 | 80 |
| US Adult R&B Airplay(Billboard) | 30 |
| US Mainstream R&B/Hip-Hop Airplay (Billboard) | 4 |
| US Rhythmic Airplay (Billboard) | 2 |
| World Digital Song Sales (Billboard) | 5 |

=== Year-end charts ===
Year-end chart performance for "Sittin' on Top of the World"
| Chart (2023) | Position |
|---|---|
| US Rhythmic (Billboard) | 19 |

== Certifications ==
| Region | Certification | Certified units/sales |
|---|---|---|
| Canada (Music Canada) | Gold | 40,000^{‡} |
| New Zealand (RMNZ) | Gold | 15,000^{‡} |
| Nigeria (TCSN) | Gold | 50,000^{‡} |
| United Kingdom (BPI) | Silver | 200,000^{‡} |
^{‡} Sales+streaming figures based on certification alone.
