= City Boys =

2023 song by Burna Boy

Single by Burna Boy

from the album I Told Them...
- Released: September 22, 2023
- Genre: Afro-fusion; afropop; alternative hip hop
- Length: 2:33
- Label: Atlantic; Spaceship; Bad Habit
- Songwriters: Damini Ebunoluwa Ogulu; Jeremy Felton; Mick Schultz; Keith James; Santeri Kauppinen; Robert Laukkanen
- Producers: MD$; Ruuben

Music video
- "City Boys" on YouTube

"City Boys" is a song by Nigerian singer Burna Boy, released on September 22, 2023, as the fifth single from his seventh studio album, I Told Them... . It was produced by MD$ and Ruuben and samples Jeremih's February 2009 single, "Birthday Sex". "City Boys" was nominated for the Grammy Award for Best African Music Performance at the 66th Annual Grammy Awards.

== Background ==
Burna Boy first teased the track on August 17, 2023, through his TikTok, posting a clip from the official music video of the track. He released the single, alongside a music video, on September 22, 2023.

== Critical reception ==
Betty Godson of NotJustOk described the album as a "headbanger" with "a wonderful tinkling sound and a strong first verse." African Folder's Bomi Anifowose noted that the track is "chest-thumping" and is "riveting and dynamic as the snippet." He also stated that "the record displays braggadocio in esteemed ramification." Writing for The Independent, Helen Brown wrote that the track "applauds sly angles of urban masculinity to a marimba and concrete punch of a beat." Julianne Escobedo Shepherd for Pitchfork wrote that on the track, Burna "explores the spoils of his talent and renown, weaving triumphantly through wealth, women, [and] weed."

=== Awards ===
"City Boys" was nominated for the Grammy Award for Best African Music Performance at the 66th Annual Grammy Awards, and Best Afrobeats at the 2024 MTV Video Music Awards.

== Live performances ==
Burna Boy performed the song at the 66th Annual Grammy Awards and at Glastonbury Festival 2024.

== Charts ==
Weekly chart performance for "City Boys"
Chart (2023)	Peak position
Canada Hot 100 (Billboard)	70
France (SNEP)	27
Global 200 (Billboard)	143
Ireland (IRMA)	44
Netherlands (Single Top 100)	14
New Zealand Hot Singles (RMNZ)	12
Nigeria (TurnTable)	2
Sweden (Sverigetopplistan)	58
Switzerland (Schweizer Hitparade)	24
UK Singles (Official Charts)	14
UK Afrobeats (OCC)	1
UK Hip Hop/R&B (Official Charts)	5
US Bubbling Under Hot 100 (Billboard)	20
World Digital Song Sales (Billboard)	7

== Certifications ==
Certifications for "City Boys"
Region	Certification	Certified units/sales
Canada (Music Canada)	Platinum	80,000^{‡}
France (SNEP)	Platinum	200,000^{‡}
New Zealand (RMNZ)	Gold	15,000^{‡}
Nigeria (TCSN)	4× Platinum	400,000^{‡}
United Kingdom (BPI)	Gold	400,000^{‡}
United States (RIAA)	Gold	500,000^{‡}
^{‡} Sales+streaming figures based on certification alone.
