= Burna Boy =

Nigerian singer-songwriter (born 1991)

Burna Boy MFR
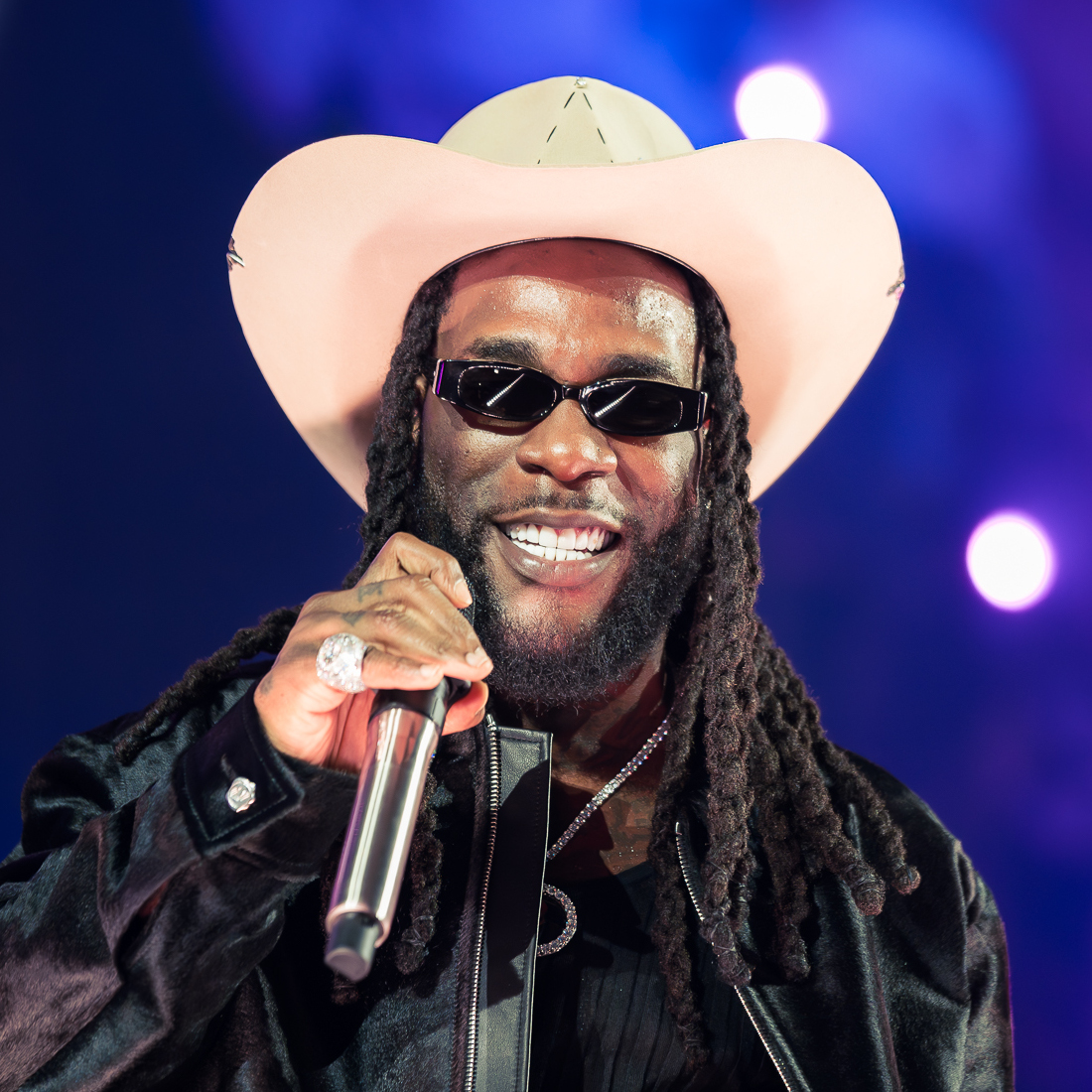
- Burna Boy in 2024
- Born: Damini Ebunoluwa Ogulu; 2 July 1991 (age 35); Port Harcourt, Rivers State, Nigeria
- Other names: African Giant; ODG; Big 7
- Occupations: Singer; songwriter; record producer
- Years active: 2010–present
- Title: Founder of Spaceship Records
- Mother: Bose Ogulu
- Relatives: Nissi Ogulu (sister) Benson Idonije (grandfather)
- Awards: Full list
- Musical career
- Origin: Lagos, Nigeria
- Genres: Afrobeats; reggae; dancehall; pop
- Instruments: Vocals; keyboards
- Works: Burna Boy discography
- Labels: Atlantic; Spaceship
- Website: onaspaceship.com

Damini Ebunoluwa Ogulu (born 2 July 1991), known professionally as Burna Boy, is a Nigerian singer, songwriter, and record producer. He gained recognition in 2012 after releasing "Like to Party", the lead single from his debut studio album L.I.F.E (2013). In 2017, Burna Boy signed a record deal with Atlantic Records and its parent company Warner Music Group. His third studio album Outside, which became his major label debut, was released in 2018.

In 2019, Burna Boy won Best International Act at the BET Awards and was named an Apple Music Up Next artist. That same year, he released his fourth studio album, African Giant, which won Album of the Year at the 2019 All Africa Music Awards and was nominated for Best World Music Album at the 62nd Annual Grammy Awards. In 2020, Burna Boy won African Artist of the Year at the Ghana Music Awards, and released his fifth studio album Twice as Tall, which won Best World Music Album at the 63rd Annual Grammy Awards. He won Best International Act at the 2021 BET Awards for the third time.

Burna Boy's sixth studio album Love, Damini, which was released in July 2022, became the highest debut Nigerian album on the Billboard 200 chart. It also became the highest-charting African album in France, the Netherlands, and the United Kingdom. In October 2022, Burna Boy was awarded the Member of the Order of the Federal Republic plaque for his achievements in music. In 2023, Rolling Stone ranked him number 197 on its list of the 200 greatest singers of all time. Burna Boy won his fourth Best International Act at the 2023 BET Awards. His song "Last Last" won Afrobeats Single of the Year and Song of the Year at The Headies 2023. Burna Boy became the first African artist to have two albums earned over 1 billion streams on Spotify. In May 2026, Burna Boy collaborated with singer Shakira for the 2026 World Cup song "Dai Dai", which achieved international success, reaching the number-one positions in over thirty countries.

== Life and career ==
=== Early life and education ===
Damini Ebunoluwa Ogulu was born on 2 July 1991, in Port Harcourt, Rivers State, Nigeria. His mother, Bose Ogulu, worked as a language translator, and his father, Samuel Ogulu, managed a welding company. His maternal grandfather Benson Idonije once managed Fela Kuti. Later, his mother became his manager. Ogulu grew up in Southern Nigeria and began making his own beats using FL Studio. He attended Corona Secondary School in Agbara, Ogun State, before relocating to London, England, to further his studies. He studied media technology at the University of Sussex from 2008 to 2009, and also studied media communications and culture at Oxford Brookes University from 2009 to 2010. Burna Boy returned to Port Harcourt and took up a year-long internship at Rhythm 93.7 FM. He launched his music career after returning to Lagos.

=== 2012–2015: L.I.F.E (Leaving an Impact for Eternity) and On a Spaceship ===
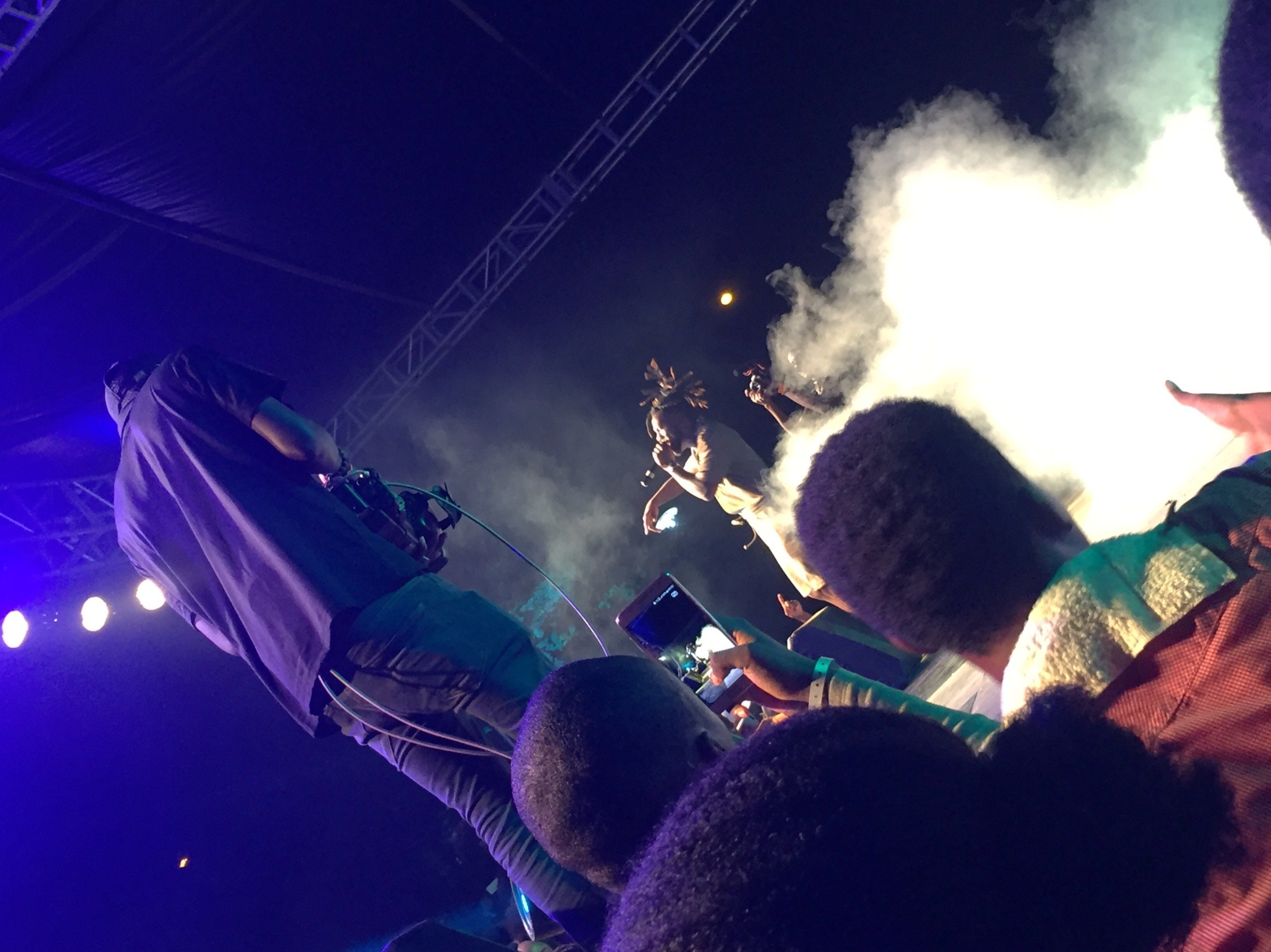
Burna Boy performing at the Nativeland concert in Lagos, 2016

Burna Boy's debut studio album, L.I.F.E, was released on 12 August 2013, serving as the follow-up to his second mixtape Burn Identity (2011). The album sold 40,000 copies on the day of its release. Aristokrat Records later sold its marketing rights to Uba Pacific for ₦10 million. The album's release was preceded by five singles: "Like to Party", "Tonight", "Always Love You", "Run My Race", and "Yawa Dey". L.I.F.E was produced entirely by Leriq and features guest appearances from 2face Idibia, M.I Abaga, Timaya, Olamide, Reminisce, and Wizkid, among others. The NET ranked the album 10th on its list of the 12th Best Albums of 2013. The album's music was inspired by Fela Kuti, King Sunny Ade, and Bob Marley. It received generally positive reviews from music critics, who applauded its production. It was nominated for Best Album of the Year at the 2014 Nigeria Entertainment Awards. In August 2013, L.I.F.E peaked at number seven on the Billboard Reggae Albums chart.

In 2014, Burna Boy split from Aristokrat Records; eight months later, he founded the record label Spaceship Entertainment, in February 2015. Burna Boy's second studio album, On a Spaceship, was released on 25 November 2015. His 7-track debut extended play, Redemption, was released in September 2016. Its lead single, "Pree Me" debuted on Noisey.

=== 2018–2019: Outside and African Giant ===
On 19 January 2018, Burna Boy was featured on American rock band Fall Out Boy's song "Sunshine Riptide", a track from their seventh studio album Mania. He released his third studio album, Outside, exactly a week later, on 26 January 2018. Described by the singer as a mixtape, Outside consists mostly of afrobeats, dancehall, reggae, and road rap. It features guest appearances from English musicians J Hus, Lily Allen, and Mabel. Outside was supported by six singles: "Rock Your Body", "Streets of Africa", "Koni Baje", "Sekkle Down", "Heaven's Gate" and "Ye". Its production was handled by Leriq, Baba Stiltz, Jae 5, Juls, Chopstix, Steel Banglez, Fred Gibson, Phantom, and FTSE. The album received positive critical acclaim and was ranked by Pulse Nigeria and Nigerian Entertainment Today as the best Nigerian album of 2018. It won Album of the Year at the 2018 Nigeria Entertainment Awards. In February 2018, Outside debuted at number three on the Billboard Reggae Albums chart. A single from the album, "Ye", ended up atop most Nigerian publications year-end list as the biggest song of 2018.

On 7 October 2018, Burna Boy performed before a sold-out crowd at London's O2 Academy Brixton. A day prior to the show, he held a pop-up event at Red by Little Farm and sold limited boxes of his Space Puffs cereal, as well as custom notepads, lighters, and graphic tee-shirts. On 9 October 2018, he was announced as one of Spotify's new Afro Hub takeover artists. The announcement coincided with him being named YouTube's Artist on the Rise for three months.

On 3 January 2019, Burna Boy was announced alongside Mr Eazi as one of the artists performing at the 2019 Coachella Valley Music and Arts Festival. He won four awards at the Soundcity MVP Awards Festival, including African Artiste of the Year, Listener's Choice, and Best Male MVP. On 21 March 2019, Burna Boy released a 4-track collaborative EP with Los Angeles-based electronic duo DJDS, titled Steel & Copper. The EP blends Burna Boy's upbeat melodies with DJDS' slinky trap beats. Steel & Copper combines elements of dancehall and reggae music with Afropop and trap.

On 24 June 2019, Burna Boy won Best International Act at the 2019 BET Awards. In July 2019, he was announced as an Apple Music Up Next artist. His inclusion in the program was accompanied by a Beats 1 interview with Julie Adenuga and a short documentary. He recorded "Ja Ara E" (Yoruba: "wise up" or "use your head") for Beyoncé's The Lion King: The Gift and was the only guest artist with their own track on the soundtrack album.

Burna Boy's fourth studio album, African Giant, was released on 26 July 2019. It was supported by six singles: "Gbona", "On the Low", Killin Dem", "Dangote", "Anybody" and "Pull Up". He began recording the album in 2018 and told Billboard that it was his most personal project yet. He first revealed plans to release it in April 2019 and held a private listening session in Los Angeles. Photos and videos from the listening session were shared on social media. African Giant was initially announced as a 16-track album. To promote the album, Burna Boy headlined the African Giant Returns tour, the second leg of his African Giant tour. Burna Boy recorded "My Money, My Baby", a track that appeared on Queen & Slim's soundtrack album. Described as an "Afrobeat-tinged track", "My Money, My Baby" contains a sample of Fela Kuti's 1972 song "Shakara". On 22 November 2019, Burna Boy was featured alongside English singer-songwriter Ed Sheeran on British rapper Stormzy's single, "Own It", the fourth single from his second studio album, Heavy Is the Head. In November 2019, he became the first Afrobeat artist to sell out the SSE Arena and was given a special plaque to mark his achievement.

=== 2020–2022: Twice as Tall and Love, Damini ===
In April 2020, Burna Boy performed in the One World: Together at Home special. On 19 June 2020, he was featured on the remix of South African producer Master KG's viral song "Jerusalema". Burna Boy used his signature afrobeat's style on the song and also partly sings in the isiZulu language. On 30 July 2020, Burna Boy was featured on British singer Sam Smith's single, "My Oasis", the lead single from their third studio album, Love Goes. His fifth studio album, Twice as Tall, was released on 14 August 2020. It was executive produced by Diddy and his mother, Bose Ogulu. The album became his highest-charting project, debuting at number one on the Billboard World Albums Chart. On 24 November 2020, Twice as Tall was nominated for Best Global Album at the 63rd Annual Grammy Awards. It was the second consecutive year that Burna Boy received a nomination in this category. He won an Edison Award in the World Album category for African Giant, and won Best International Act at the MOBO Awards on December 9, shaking off competition from Drake, Megan Thee Stallion, Lil Baby and Roddy Ricch. At the 63rd Annual Grammy Awards held on 15 March 2021, he won the Grammy award for Best Global Music album. Burna Boy's song "Destiny" was included in the playlist at the inauguration of Joe Biden. He won Best International Act at the 2021 BET Awards, becoming the first African artist to win the award three consecutive times.

On 19 March 2021, Burna Boy was featured on Canadian singer Justin Bieber's song "Loved by You", a track from his sixth studio album, Justice. On 17 September 2021, he was featured on American singer-songwriter Jon Bellion's single "I Feel It", which marked the first musical collaboration between the two, but the latter co-wrote "Loved by You" with Justin Bieber. On 4 June 2022, Burna Boy performed at the Belgravia Sports Stadium in Harare, Zimbabwe, where he allegedly refused money to wear a ZANU-PF scarf as an endorsement of the Mnangagwa administration.

In 2022, he was named the "Best Solo Act in the World" by NME. Burna Boy released his sixth studio album, Love, Damini, on 8 July 2022. Its release was preceded by the singles "Kilometre" and "Last Last". Burna Boy held his first concert in Jamaica on 18 December 2022, at the Jamaica National Stadium.

=== 2023–2024: I Told Them... ===
In April 2023, Burna Boy released a song titled "Mera Na", featuring Sidhu Moose Wala, in tribute to Moosewala, who was assassinated in 2022. "Mera Na" charted on various international charts including Billboard Global 200, Canada Hot 100, and New Zealand Hot Singles chart. In June, he released the single "Sittin On Top Of The World", which heavily samples American singer Brandy's 1998 hit single "Top of the World".

On 10 June 2023, Burna Boy became the first artist from Africa to perform at the UEFA Champions League Final Kick Off Show by Pepsi. The singer took the stage at the Atatürk Olympic Stadium in Istanbul, Turkey, in front of more than 71,412 supporters and an audience of over 700 million people. In July, he became the first African artist to headline and sell out a stadium show in the United States, headlining at Citi Field in New York. He was named by Billboard as the top Afrobeat artist of the year 2023. At the 2023 Billboard Music Awards, Burna was awarded the inaugural best Afrobeats award becoming the first African artist to win a BBMA as lead artist alongside Rema who won best afrobeat song that night. In November he was nominated for four Grammy awards, making him the most nominated Nigerian artist in Grammy history with ten total career nominations and the first Nigerian to have nominations in five consecutive years, from 2019 to 2023. He was named as 2023 most streamed Sub-saharan African artists globally on Spotify, making it his second year in a row. While congratulating African artists for their Grammy nominations, The Recording Academy described Burna Boy as the biggest artist in Africa. The Nation named him the entertainer of the year for having an unrivaled and outstanding year.

"Sittin' on Top of the World" received a nomination for Best Melodic Rap Performance at the 66th Annual Grammy Awards. Burna Boy performed the song at the ceremony on 4 February 2024, alongside Brandy and 21 Savage. In November 2024, his popular song "Higher" was nominated for Best African Music Performance at the 67th Annual Grammy Awards, which will be held in February 2025 at the Crypto.com Arena in Los Angeles. He has been nominated for the award six times throughout his career.

=== 2025–present: No Sign of Weakness ===
On 10 July 2025, Burna Boy released his eighth studio album No Sign of Weakness, featuring Travis Scott, Mick Jagger, Stromae, and Shaboozey on a song each. Through this album, he refined his style from being collab-heavy to more singles. The album was produced by his label Spaceship, as well as Atlantic Records and Bad Habit. The album features several distinct music styles, including country, '90s hiphop, tech house, rock, and Nigerian electronic music.

Burna Boy announced the No Sign of Weakness North America tour a few weeks prior to the album's release, with the tour starting at Red Rocks Amphitheatre in Colorado in November. All North American shows will feature a 360-degree stage, except for Red Rocks, which is at a natural amphitheatre. He also performed at Waldbühne in Berlin and SparkassenPark in Mönchengladbach, Germany, and at Wireless Festival in England prior to the tour.

On 11 June 2026, Burna Boy and Colombian singer Shakira performed "Dai Dai", the official anthem of the 2026 FIFA World Cup, at the tournament's opening ceremony at Estadio Azteca in Mexico City. Co-written by Ed Sheeran and producer Alexander Castillo, the song was described by Shakira as needing "a very masculine voice" in an Afrobeats setting, and she said she waited roughly 20 days for Burna Boy to record his verse before he sent it. On 19 July, Burna Boy and Shakira reunited to perform "Dai Dai" at MetLife Stadium in New Jersey during the inaugural 2026 FIFA World Cup final halftime show, joined by Uganda's Ghetto Kids dance troupe; the roughly 27-minute show, curated by Coldplay frontman Chris Martin, also featured Madonna and Justin Bieber. Burna Boy later said Sheeran, who he described as one of the most thoughtful people he had worked with, had been the first to approach him about the collaboration and had personally forewarned him about the pressure of performing at the final. The success of "Dai Dai" drove Burna Boy's Spotify monthly listener count past 57.7 million by early August 2026, moving him ahead of Madonna (approximately 55.8 million) and Adele (approximately 54.8 million) on the platform.

He starred in the 2026 video game Grand Theft Auto VI as the radio host of AfroBank FM.

In October 2026, Burna Boy became the first Nigerian artist to present an award at the Ballon d’Or ceremony, presenting the Sócrates Award to Bukayo Saka at the 70th edition held in London.

== Personal life ==
Burna Boy dated British rapper Stefflon Don from 2018 to 2022. In December 2024, rumours about Burna Boy’s relationship with American R&B singer Chloe Bailey surfaced after she spent time with him during Lagos' Detty December celebrations. Videos of them enjoying Lagos nightlife further fueled speculation. On 7 February 2025, Premium Times Nigeria confirmed that they were dating after being spotted on a Valentine’s-themed dinner date in Lagos, engaging in public displays of affection.

In 2025, Burna Boy was named one of GQ's Best-Dressed Men. In November 2025, Ogulu stated during an interview with streamer PlaqueBoyMax that he had converted from Christianity to Islam. He described the conversion as a personal decision made as part of his spiritual exploration of different religions. Burna Boy is a football fan and supports Manchester United. In a 2026 interview with ESPN UK, he said that former Nigerian international Jay-Jay Okocha was his favorite player, calling him the greatest footballer of all time.

== Artistry ==
Burna Boy's music is primarily a mixture of Afrobeats, hip-hop, reggae, and R&B. His music, which he refers to as "Afro-fusion", is a combination of Afrobeat, dancehall, hip-hop, pop, R&B, and reggae. August Brown of the Los Angeles Times describes Burna Boy's sound as "savvy and modern but undistracted by obvious crossover moves". Kittitian dancehall artist Byron Messia described him as an incredibly talented lyricist who does not write down lyrics or waste time in the studio to create a song. In an interview with The Punch, Burna Boy shared how he gets inspiration: "I get into the booth and lay down the melody and the music just comes to me. honestly, I can't really explain it—the inspiration and ideas just flow through me spiritually when I'm in the studio."

He has earned local acclaim from fans and critics for the lyrical content of his songs, which stand out in the Afrobeats landscape, where songs are usually optimised for danceability at the expense of penmanship. He has also discussed political topics in his music, such as on the African Giant track "Another Story". Nigerian singer Omah Lay claimed Burna Boy is the best songwriter he has ever seen and an inspiration when it comes to the art of writing. He is known for his vocal texture, as well as his baritone voice, singing in a blend of English, Yoruba, and Nigerian Pidgin. Rolling Stone listed Burna Boy among the 200 greatest singers of all time.

== Legacy ==
Burna Boy's success has led some to opine that he has cultivated a profile of a leading figure in Afrobeats. Talent manager Kim Moore told CNN that "Burna Boy's [Grammy] win will inspire other African artistes to create projects that appeal to global audiences." BBC radio presenter Darren Joseph described him as "an icon among a generation".

"Burna Boy has not diluted his African heritage to reach his global audience, Instead he has placed an unmistakably African stamp on music drawn from all around Africa. A voice that exemplifies the West African cultural virtue of coolness, poise and control."

— Jon Pareles, The New York Times

Rolling Stone described him as a "Nigerian cultural giant", who has become "the ambassador of Afrobeats as a global movement that can feel equally at home by climbing the European charts and maintaining a subtle emotional connection with past African genres like highlife." Lloyd Bradley of The Guardian opined that Twice As Tall positions African music in the 21st century by using contemporary sounds for traditional melodies and rhythms. In 2021, Pitchfork named him one of the most important artists of their first 25 years.

BOF named him as one of the people shaping the global fashion industry 2023. Lawrence Burney of Vulture has argued that Burna Boy's stylistic presentation and convincing interpretation of hip-hop and dancehall won him "more credibility and commerciality in America than his Naija contemporaries, Davido and Wizkid". African artist Angélique Kidjo dedicated her Grammy win to Burna Boy, for changing the global perception of Africa and its music. Aniefiok Ekpoudom of The Guardian said "Burna Boy is on a mission to remind Africans everywhere about their roots in the continent, and Afrobeats is his tool".

At the 2026 All Africa Music Awards (AFRIMA), Burna Boy won Album of the Year for No Sign of Weakness and shared Best African Collaboration with Shallipopi, highlighting his continued dominance in African music in 2026.

== Controversies ==
=== "Acting Bad" dispute ===
On 2 May 2016, a song titled "Acting Bad" was uploaded online without any prior announcement. Burna Boy quickly clarified on Twitter that the track was recorded over a year earlier, in January 2015, and that it was unfinished and leaked without his permission. The song's producer, Orbeat, best known for his work on Burna Boy's hit "Soke", publicly lashed out at the artist, claiming the release was unauthorized and that he had not been fully paid for his work. He accused Burna Boy of disrespecting him and misrepresenting the situation, denying that he was the one who leaked the track. Orbeat also said he had already used the beat in his own material and had repossessed it after their fallout. Tensions escalated as both parties exchanged heated messages on Twitter, with Orbeat making personal accusations and Burna Boy responding with now-deleted tweets aimed at his critics.

=== 2019 Africans Unite concert ===
In November 2019, Burna Boy was announced as the headliner for the 'Africans Unite' concert in South Africa, an event aimed at promoting unity and addressing xenophobia. However, his previous statements condemning alleged xenophobic attacks in South Africa and expressing hesitance to visit the country led to public criticism. South African artists and members of the public called for an apology, which Burna Boy declined to issue. Citing threats of violence and safety concerns, the event organizers ultimately cancelled the concert.

Burna Boy also engaged in a public dispute with South African rapper AKA on Twitter, stemming from discussions about xenophobic violence in South Africa. Burna Boy criticized the attacks and, in a since-deleted tweet, stated he would physically confront AKA if they met.

In response, AKA expressed disappointment, emphasising South Africa's prior support for Burna Boy’s career before his international success, and called for an apology. The dispute gained further attention when Burna Boy’s planned performance at the 'Africans Unite' concert reignited public pressure for him to apologise. Amid growing concerns over safety and controversy, the concert was cancelled. In 2022, AKA indicated that he no longer harbored issues with Burna Boy, suggesting a potential reconciliation between the artists.

=== 2022 Lagos nightclub shooting case ===
On 8 June 2022, Burna Boy's armed security escorts allegedly shot and wounded two people at a nightclub in Lagos. According to the wife of one of the victims, the incident began after she declined Burna Boy's invitation to join him in the VIP section. Five security guards affiliated with Burna Boy were arrested and charged with attempted murder. The victim later accused the singer and his family of trying to silence her family with hush money. As of 20 June 2022, CCTV footage of the shooting had not been released by the club. On 1 January 2023, during the Lagos leg of his Love, Damini tour, a visibly upset Burna Boy denied the nightclub shooting rumour and rumours about his mother being a former backup dancer for Afrobeat pioneer Fela Kuti.

== Activism ==
Burna Boy’s guiding philosophy is Pan-Africanism. He believes in "rebuilding bridges" with the African diaspora, believing Africa as the mother continent and birthplace of humankind. He has been a vocal advocate for social justice across the world. Burna Boy's music is not just entertainment; it is a call to action as he uses his platform to speak truth to power and shine a light on issues affecting people in Nigeria and around the world. In his fourth studio album African Giant, he probes Nigeria’s turbulent history by breaking down the narratives that have surrounded it since it gained independence. Songs like "Another Story" condemn the negative impact of the Royal Niger Company in imposing colonial rule on Nigeria, "Collateral Damage" criticises the cowardice of Nigerians in not confronting their oppressors while "Wetin Man Go Do" laments the suffering of the masses. BBC radio presenter DJ Target said: "He represents change, and speaks out against injustice while representing young Africa and making worldwide hits."

Following the 2019 Johannesburg riots in South Africa that targeted Africans living in the country, he vowed not to visit South Africa again if the government did not take necessary action to address the issue. In 2020, he set up a relief fund for victims of #EndSARS anti-police brutality protests. Estelle Uba of The Republic said Burna Boy’s powerful lyrics force not just Nigerians, but citizens from countries with a past of colonial subjugation in the Global South Africa, Asia, and South America to reckon with, and confront the reality of the neo-colonialism in their countries. Through his single "20-10-20", released in solidarity to the 2020 Lekki shooting, he gave an active voice against the alleged shooting of #EndSARS protesters, bad governance, corruption and police brutality in Nigeria.

== Discography ==
Studio albums

- L.I.F.E (2013)
- On a Spaceship (2015)
- Outside (2018)
- African Giant (2019)
- Twice as Tall (2020)
- Love, Damini (2022)
- I Told Them... (2023)
- No Sign of Weakness (2025)

== Tour ==
- Life on the Outside Tour (2018)
- African Giant Tour (2019)
- Twice as Tall Tour (2020)
- Love, Damini Tour (2022)
- I Told Them... Tour (2023)
- No Sign of Weakness Tour (2025)

== See also ==
- List of artists who reached number one in Nigeria
- List of Nigerian musicians
- List of people from Port Harcourt
