= Spaceship Records =

Record label in Nigeria

- Parent company: Spaceship Collective
- Founded: 18 February 2015; 11 years ago
- Founder: Burna Boy
- Status: Active
- Distributors: Spaceship Publishing, Atlantic Records
- Genre: Various
- Country of origin: Nigeria
- Location: Lagos
- Official website: Onaspaceship.com
- Services: Music recording; Music publishing
- Divisions: Spaceship Publishing

Spaceship Records (also known as Spaceship Entertainment or Spaceship), is a Nigerian-based record label founded by recording artist Burna Boy, as a flagship of Spaceship Collective. The label was launched in 2015, and is home to recording acts Nissi and Burna Boy. It also houses producers LeriQ and Telz. Artists formerly signed to the label include Bnxn.

== History ==
Spaceship Entertainment was founded on 18 February 2015 by Burna Boy. In 2020, it began to operate under the name Spaceship Records. The record label was relaunched under Spaceship Collective, and currently holds the highest share in the company. Spaceship was established following Burna Boy's departure from Aristokrat Records, a record label owned by Piriye Isokrari.

In 2020, Burna Boy signed LeriQ, Nissi, and Telz to Spaceship. On 16 April 2020, Burna Boy unveiled the signing of Buju.

== Buju's departure ==
Buju's departure surfaced after his one year deal with Spaceship expired in April 2021. During his stay with the label, he released and promoted various singles including "Lenu (remix)" with Burna Boy, and "So Lonely".

== Accolades ==
Spaceship was nominated for Record Label of the Year at The Beatz Awards 2019.

Year	Awards ceremony	Award description(s)	Results
2019	The Beatz Awards	Record Label of the Year	Nominated

== Artists ==
Current acts

Act	Year signed	Releases under the label
Burna Boy	2015	4
Nissi	2020	1

Former acts

Act	Year signed	Year left	Releases under the label
Buju	2020	2021	—

== Producers ==
Current producers

- LeriQ
- Telz

== Discography ==
Albums/mixtapes/EPs

Artist	Album	Details
Burna Boy	On a Spaceship	Released: 2015; Formats: CD, digital download
Burna Boy	Outside	Released: January 26, 2018; Formats: CD, digital download
Burna Boy	African Giant	Released: July 26, 2019; Formats: CD, digital download
Burna Boy	Twice as Tall	Released: August 14, 2020; Formats: CD, LP, digital download
Nissi	IGNITE	Released: 31 July 2020; Formats: CD, digital download
