= List of awards and nominations received by Tyla =

Tyla awards and nominations
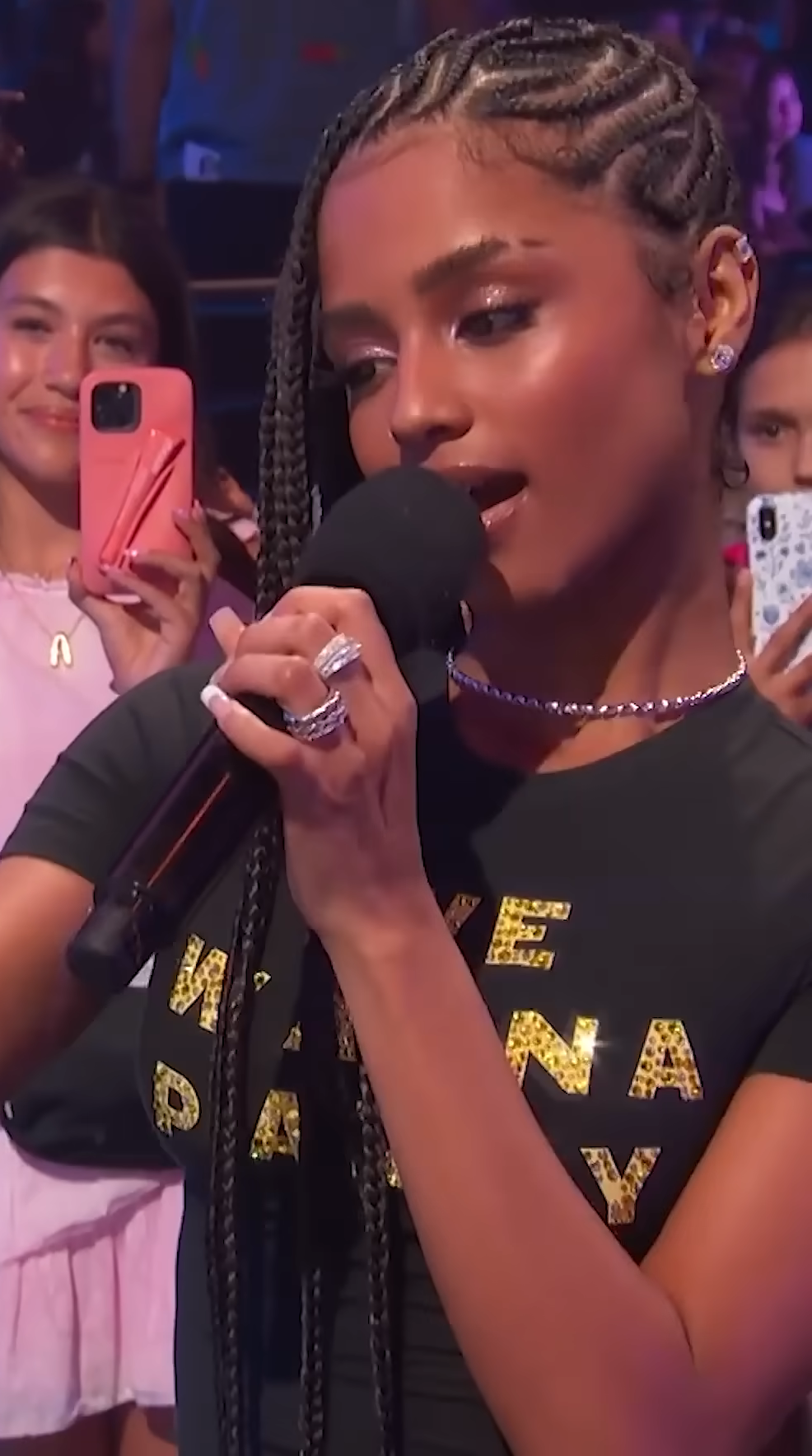
- Tyla hosting the 2025 Kids' Choice Awards
Awards and nominations
Award	Wins	Nominations
3Music Awards	1	2
Africa Golden Awards	0	3
African Entertainment Awards USA	1	4
All Africa Music Awards	0	2
American Music Awards	3	6
Basadi in Music Awards	3	9
BBC	1	1
BET Awards	2	7
Billboard Music Awards	2	8
Billboard R&B's No. 1s	1	1
Billboard Women in Music	1	1
BreakTudo Awards	0	3
BRIT Awards	0	1
Cultural and Creative Industry Awards	1	2
Content Creator Awards	1	1
Elle Style Awards	1	1
Feather Awards	0	1
Glamour Awards	1	1
Grammy Awards	2	2
GQ Men of the Year	1	1
The Headies	0	2
iHeartRadio Music Awards	1	7
Ivor Novello Awards	0	1
Metro FM Music Awards	1	6
MOBO Awards	0	5
MTV Europe Music Awards	3	4
MTV Video Music Awards	2	5
Music Awards Japan	1	1
Myx Music Awards	0	1
NAACP Image Awards	1	3
Nickelodeon Kids' Choice Awards	1	6
Soul Train Music Awards	0	2
South African Music Awards	5	10
South African Style Awards	1	1
The Streamer Awards	1	1
Trace Awards	1	7
Urban Music Awards	0	7
Variety Power of Young Hollywood	1	1

Totals (Note: Certain award groups do not simply award one winner. They acknowledge several different recipients, have runners-up, and have third place. Since this is a specific recognition and is different from losing an award, runner-up mentions are considered wins in this award tally. For simplification and to avoid errors, each award in this list has been presumed to have had a prior nomination.)
- Wins: 41
- Nominations: 127

The South African singer Tyla has won a total of 41 industry awards from 127 nominations throughout her career. Her self-titled debut studio album was released in 2024 and debuted at number 24 on the US Billboard 200 chart. The album spawned her breakthrough single, "Water", which peaked at number seven on the US Billboard Hot 100. That same year, she was named the youngest African soloist to win a Grammy Award at the 66th Annual Grammy Awards after winning the inaugural Best African Music Performance.

Tyla started off doing cover versions of pop songs before she joined the amapiano wave. She released her debut single, "Getting Late", in 2019; its music video was nominated for Best Music Video of the Year at the 28th Annual South African Music Awards in 2022. In 2023, she released "Been Thinking", which was nominated for Best Produced Music Video at the 29th Annual South African Music Awards, and she won the Best Female Artist award at the 9th Annual African Entertainment Awards USA later that year. She was also nominated for Best New Artist at the Soul Train Music Awards, and Best African Music Act at the MOBO Awards.

In 2024, Tyla went on to win the most awards at the BET Awards, tying with the American singers Usher and Victoria Monét at the Peacock Theater in Los Angeles, California, where she was named the Best New Artist and Best International Act. She received backlash after winning Best Afrobeats Video at the MTV Video Music Awards, where she identified as an amapiano artist in her acceptance speech. In her native South Africa, she received the Song of the Year, International Achievement and Highest Airplay awards at the 3rd Annual Basadi in Music Awards; she was the most-nominated recipient with five, and the most-awarded performing artist at the event. She also took home the Best International Act at the Cultural and Creative Industry Awards, and the Most Stylish Performing Artist at the South African Style Awards. She led the 18th Metro FM Music Awards nomination list with six, and she was honoured with the Global Icon award. Tyla received a Global Force accolade at the inaugural Billboard R&B's No. 1s event. Towards the end of 2024, at the 30th Annual South African Music Awards, Tyla won the most awards, receiving four from seven nominations. GQ honoured her with the Entertainer of the Year award. Tyla received the Impact Award in 2025, at the Billboard Women in Music Awards. Tyla hosted the 2025 Kids' Choice Awards. She also won the Favorite Global Music Star award and she was nominated for Favorite Music Collaboration for her remix of "Show Me Love".

== Awards and nominations ==
Awards and nominations received by Tyla
Award	Year (Note: Indicates the year of ceremony. Each year is linked to the article about the awards held that year, wherever possible.)	Category	Recipient(s) or nominee(s)	Result	Ref.
3Music Awards	2024	African Song of the Year	"Water"	Won	
3Music Awards	2024	African Act of the Year	Tyla	—N/a	(Note: There is no record of this award being issued anywhere in 2024, only the nomination was announced.)
Africa Golden Awards	2025	Album of the Year	Tyla	Nominated	
Africa Golden Awards	2025	Female Artist of the Year	Tyla	Nominated	
Africa Golden Awards	2025	Song of the Year	"Jump" (with Gunna and Skillibeng)	Nominated	
African Entertainment Awards USA	2023	Best Female Artist	Tyla	Won	
African Entertainment Awards USA	2024	Best Female Artist	Tyla	Nominated	
African Entertainment Awards USA	2024	Artist of the Year	Tyla	Nominated	
African Entertainment Awards USA	2024	Best Collaboration	"Jump" (with Gunna and Skillibeng)	Nominated	
All Africa Music Awards	2026	Song of the Year	"Push 2 Start"	Nominated	
All Africa Music Awards	2026	Best African Dance/Choreography	"Push 2 Start"	Nominated	
American Music Awards	2025	Favorite Female R&B Artist	Tyla	Nominated	
American Music Awards	2025	Favorite Afrobeats Artist	Tyla	Won	
American Music Awards	2026	Best Music Video	"Chanel"	Nominated	
American Music Awards	2026	Best Female R&B Artist	Tyla	Nominated	
American Music Awards	2026	Best Afrobeats Artist	Tyla	Won	
American Music Awards	2026	Social Song of the Year	"Chanel"	Won	
Basadi in Music Awards	2024	Artist of the Year	Tyla	Nominated	
Basadi in Music Awards	2024	Best Styled Artist of the Year	Tyla	Nominated	
Basadi in Music Awards	2024	Pop Artist of the Year	"Water"	Nominated	
Basadi in Music Awards	2024	Music Video of the Year	"Water"	Nominated	
Basadi in Music Awards	2024	Song of the Year	"Water"	Won	
Basadi in Music Awards	2024	Highest Airplay	Tyla	Won	
Basadi in Music Awards	2024	International Achievement	Tyla	Won	
Basadi in Music Awards	2026	Artist of the Year	Tyla	Nominated	
Basadi in Music Awards	2026	Song of the Year	"Chanel"	Nominated	
BBC	2024	Sound of 2024	Tyla	Fourth	
BET Awards	2024	Best Female R&B/Pop Artist	Tyla	Nominated	
BET Awards	2024	Best New Artist	Tyla	Won	
BET Awards	2024	Best International Act	Tyla	Won	
BET Awards	2024	Viewer's Choice Award	"Water"	Nominated	
BET Awards	2025	Best International Act	Tyla	Nominated	
BET Awards	2026	Viewer's Choice Award	"Chanel"	Nominated	
BET Awards	2026	Video of the Year	"Chanel"	Nominated	
Billboard Music Awards	2024	Top R&B Artist	Tyla	Nominated	
Billboard Music Awards	2024	Top R&B Female Artist	Tyla	Nominated	
Billboard Music Awards	2024	Top Afrobeats Artist	Tyla	Won	
Billboard Music Awards	2024	Top R&B Song	"Water"	Nominated	
Billboard Music Awards	2024	Top Afrobeats Song	"Water"	Won	
Billboard Music Awards	2024	Top Afrobeats Song	"Truth or Dare"	Nominated	
Billboard Music Awards	2024	Top Afrobeats Song	"Jump" (with Gunna and Skillibeng)	Nominated	
Billboard Music Awards	2024	Top R&B Album	Tyla	Nominated	
Billboard R&B's No. 1s	2024	Global Force	Tyla	Won	
Billboard Women in Music	2025	Impact	Tyla	Won	
BreakTudo Awards	2024	International Video of the Year	"Water"	Nominated	
BreakTudo Awards	2024	Rising International Artist	Tyla	Nominated	
BreakTudo Awards	2024	International Crush	Tyla	Nominated	
BRIT Awards	2024	International Song	"Water"	Nominated	
Cultural and Creative Industry Awards	2024	Best International Act	Tyla	Won	
Cultural and Creative Industry Awards	2024	Best Newcomer	Tyla	Nominated	
Content Creator Awards	2024	Song of the Year	"Water"	Won	
Elle Style Awards	2026	Artist of the Year	Tyla	Won	
Feather Awards	2024	Hot Chick of the Year	Tyla	Nominated	
Glamour Awards	2025	Global Woman of the Year	Tyla	Won	
Grammy Awards	2024	Best African Music Performance	"Water"	Won	
Grammy Awards	2026	Best African Music Performance	"Push 2 Start"	Won	
GQ Men of the Year	2024	Entertainer of the Year	Tyla	Won	
The Headies	2025	Best Southern African Artiste of the Year	Tyla	Nominated	
The Headies	2027	Best Southern African Artiste of the Year	Tyla	Pending	
iHeartRadio Music Awards	2024	Best African Music Artist	Tyla	Nominated	
iHeartRadio Music Awards	2024	Best Lyrics	"Water"	Nominated	
iHeartRadio Music Awards	2024	TikTok Bop of the Year	"Water"	Nominated	
iHeartRadio Music Awards	2025	R&B Song of the Year	"Water"	Nominated	
iHeartRadio Music Awards	2025	Dance Song of the Year	"Water" (with Marshmello)	Nominated	
iHeartRadio Music Awards	2025	World Artist of the Year	Tyla	Won	
iHeartRadio Music Awards	2026	World Artist of the Year	Tyla	Nominated	
Ivor Novello Awards	2024	Best Contemporary Song	"Water"	Nominated	
Metro FM Music Awards	2024	Song of the Year	"Water"	Nominated	
Metro FM Music Awards	2024	Best Music Video	"Water"	Nominated	
Metro FM Music Awards	2024	Best Viral Challenge	"Water"	Nominated	
Metro FM Music Awards	2024	Best R&B	"Water"	Nominated	
Metro FM Music Awards	2024	Best Female Artist	Tyla	Nominated	
Metro FM Music Awards	2024	Artist of the Year	Tyla	Nominated	
Metro FM Music Awards	2024	Global Icon	Tyla	Won	
MOBO Awards	2023	Best African Music Act	Tyla	Nominated	
MOBO Awards	2025	Best African Music Act	Tyla	Nominated	
MOBO Awards	2025	Best International Act	Tyla	Nominated	
MOBO Awards	2026	Best International Act	Tyla	Nominated	
MOBO Awards	2026	Best African Music Act	Tyla	Nominated	
MTV Europe Music Awards	2024	Best New	Tyla	Nominated	
MTV Europe Music Awards	2024	Best R&B	Tyla	Won	
MTV Europe Music Awards	2024	Best Afrobeats	Tyla	Won	
MTV Europe Music Awards	2024	Best African Act	Tyla	Won	
MTV Video Music Awards	2024	Best New Artist	Tyla	Nominated	
MTV Video Music Awards	2024	Best R&B Video	"Water"	Nominated	
MTV Video Music Awards	2024	Best Afrobeats Video	"Water"	Won	
MTV Video Music Awards	2025	Best Afrobeats Video	"Push 2 Start"	Won	
MTV Video Music Awards	2025	Best Choreography	"Push 2 Start"	Nominated	
Music Awards Japan	2026	Best International R&B/Contemporary Song in Japan	"Chanel"	Won	
Music Awards Japan	2026	Best of Listeners' Choice: International Song	"Chanel"	Nominated	
Myx Music Awards	2024	Global Video of the Year	"Water"	Nominated	
NAACP Image Awards	2025	Outstanding New Artist	Tyla	Nominated	
NAACP Image Awards	2025	Outstanding International Song	"Jump" (with Gunna and Skillibeng)	Nominated	
NAACP Image Awards	2026	Outstanding International Song	"Is It"	Won	
Nickelodeon Kids' Choice Awards	2024	Favorite Breakout Artist	Tyla	Nominated	
Nickelodeon Kids' Choice Awards	2024	Favorite Global Music Star	Tyla	Nominated	
Nickelodeon Kids' Choice Awards	2024	Favorite Viral Song	"Water"	Nominated	
Nickelodeon Kids' Choice Awards	2025	Favourite Global Music Star	Tyla	Won	
Nickelodeon Kids' Choice Awards	2025	Favourite Music Collaboration	"Show Me Love" (with WizTheMc and bees & honey)	Nominated	
Nickelodeon Kids' Choice Awards	2026	Favourite Global Music Star	Tyla	Pending	
Soul Train Music Awards	2023	Best New Artist	Tyla	Nominated	
Soul Train Music Awards	2026	R&B/Soul song of the year	"Chanel"	Pending	
South African Music Awards	2022	Music Video of the Year	"Getting Late" (featuring Kooldrink)	Nominated	
South African Music Awards	2023	Best Produced Music Video	"Been Thinking"	Nominated	
South African Music Awards	2024	Music Video of the Year	"Water"	Nominated	
South African Music Awards	2024	Record of the Year	"Water"	Nominated	
South African Music Awards	2024	Album of the Year	Tyla	Nominated	
South African Music Awards	2024	Best Pop Album	Tyla	Won	
South African Music Awards	2024	Female Artist of the Year	Tyla	Won	
South African Music Awards	2024	Newcomer of the Year	Tyla	Won	
South African Music Awards	2024	Best Collaboration	"Water" (with Travis Scott)	Nominated	
South African Music Awards	2024	International Achievement	Tyla	Won	(Note: Announced on 18 October 2024, by the South African Music Awards via social media)
South African Music Awards	2026	International Achievement	Tyla	Won	
South African Style Awards	2024	Most Stylish Performing Artist	Tyla	Won	
The Streamer Awards	2026	Best Mainstream Collab	Tyla and Kai Cenat	Won	
Trace Awards	2025	Song of the Year	"Jump" (with Gunna and Skillibeng)	Nominated	
Trace Awards	2025	Best Global African Artist	Tyla	Nominated	
Trace Awards	2025	Best Female Artist	Tyla	Won	
Trace Awards	2025	Best Live Performance	Tyla	Nominated	
Trace Awards	2025	Best Artist – Southern Africa	Tyla	Nominated	
Trace Awards	2025	Best Music Video	"Jump" (with Gunna and Skillibeng) (directed by Nabil Elderkin)	Nominated	
Trace Awards	2025	Best DJ	"One Call" (with Spinall and Omah Lay)	Nominated	
Urban Music Awards	2025	Artist of the Year	Tyla	Nominated	
Urban Music Awards	2025	Best Music Video	"Push 2 Start" (Remix) (with Sean Paul)	Nominated	
Urban Music Awards	2025	Best Female Act	Tyla	Nominated	
Urban Music Awards	2025	Best International Collaboration	"No.1" (with Tems)	Nominated	
Urban Music Awards	2025	International Artist of the Year	Tyla	Nominated	
Urban Music Awards	2025	Best Viral Breakthrough Song	"Water"	Nominated	
Urban Music Awards	2025	Best Album	Tyla	Nominated	
Variety Power of Young Hollywood	2025	Influence and impact in music and pop culture	Tyla	Won	

== Other accolades ==
=== Listicles ===
Listicles
Publication	Year	Listicle	Recipient(s) and nominee(s)	Rank	Ref.
BBC	2023	The Best Songs of 2023	"Water"	10	
Billboard	2023	The 100 Best Songs of 2023	"Water"	18	
Forbes	2024	30 Under 30	Tyla	—N/a	
The Hollywood Reporter	2023	The 10 Best Songs of 2023	"Water"	10	
The Hollywood Reporter	2024	TRH's 2024 Hot list	Tyla	24	
Madame Tussauds	2025	Hot 100 list	Tyla	—N/a	
