= Is It Love (Tyla song) =

Single by Tyla

from the album A*Pop
- Released: 18 June 2026
- Genre: R&B
- Length: 3:07
- Label: FAX; Epic
- Songwriters: Richard Isong; Cole Ostrin; Tyla Seethal; Douglas Ford; Bardriia Bourelly
- Producers: Cole Ostrin; P2J

Tyla singles chronology
"Game Time" (2026)	"Is It Love" (2026)	"That Girl" (2026)

Music video
- "Is It Love" on YouTube

"Is It Love" is a song by the South African singer-songwriter Tyla. It was released on 18 June 2026 as the third single from her second studio album A*Pop (2026).

== Background and release ==
The single was teased on Tyla's Instagram and TikTok accounts eleven days before its release, revealing the title the same day. After her FIFA World Cup US Opening performance, The song serves as the third single from her second studio album A*Pop. The song shares a similar title with "Is It", which was previously released as a single in 2025 for Tyla's second EP, WWP. The song is the album's first track (with the latter mentioned song being included as the album's fourth track) and follows the releases of "She Did It Again" with Zara Larsson and the official 2026 FIFA World Cup album song "Game Time" with Future in April and May 2026, respectively.

== Charts ==
=== Weekly charts ===
Weekly chart performance
Chart (2026)	Peak position
Costa Rica Anglo Airplay (Monitor Latino)	17
Estonia Airplay (TopHit)	55
Lithuania Airplay (TopHit)	71
New Zealand Hot Singles (RMNZ)	8
South Africa Domestic Airplay (TOSAC)	5
South Africa Streaming (TOSAC)	17
UK Afrobeats (Official Charts)	3
US Afrobeats Songs (Billboard)	1
US Hot R&B/Hip-Hop Songs (Billboard)	36
US Rhythmic Airplay (Billboard)	2

=== Monthly charts ===
Monthly chart performance
Chart (2026)	Peak position
Estonia Airplay (TopHit)	84

== Release history ==
Release dates and formats
Region	Date	Format	Label	Ref.
Various	18 June 2026	Digital download; streaming	FAX; Epic	
United States	30 June 2026	Rhythmic crossover radio	FAX; Epic	
