= A*Pop =

Studio album by Tyla
- Released: 24 July 2026
- Recorded: 2025–2026
- Length: 43:59
- Languages: English; Zulu; Xhosa
- Labels: FAX; Epic
- Producers: Believve; DameDame; the Elements; Jonathan Hamilton; Akeel Henry; Ian Kirkpatrick; Loof; Mocha Bands; Cole Ostrin; P2J; Ari PenSmith; Thabo "Ryzor" Shokgolo; Sammy Soso; Stryv; Sucuki

Tyla chronology
WWP (2025)	A*Pop (2026)

Singles from A*Pop
- 1. "Chanel" Released: 24 October 2025; 2. "She Did It Again" Released: 17 April 2026; 3. "Is It Love" Released: 18 June 2026; 4. "That Girl" Released: 24 July 2026

A*Pop (stylised in all caps) is the second studio album by South African singer Tyla. It was released on 24 July 2026 through FAX and Epic Records. The album features guest appearances from Babalwa M, MaWhoo, Liquideep, and Zara Larsson. Tyla collaborated with various producers on the album, including Akeel Henry, Ari PenSmith, Believve, Cole Ostrin, Ian Kirkpatrick, Sammy Soso, and P2J, among others. The album incorporates elements of African pop, amapiano, dance, electropop, pop, and R&B in its production.

The album was preceded by multiple singles, including "Chanel", "She Did It Again" (featuring Larsson), and "Is It Love". "Chanel" charted within the top twenty in multiple countries and on the Billboard Global 200. The fourth single, "That Girl", was released simultaneously with the album, and the tracklist also contains the previously-released single "Is It" from Tyla's extended play (EP) WWP (2025).

Upon release, A*Pop received generally positive reviews from critics, who praised its blending of genres, though derided the album's rollout. The album charted within the top forty in Australia, Germany, New Zealand, Scotland, and Switzerland. To support the album, Tyla went on the A*Pop World Tour, commencing in October 2026 and due to conclude in March 2027, with shows in Europe, the USA and South Africa.

== Background ==
Following the release of her debut studio album, Tyla, in 2024, Tyla undertook a promotional cycle that included the Tyla Tour (2024–2025) and the We Wanna Party Tour (2025). She also released the album's deluxe edition, which spawned the single "Push 2 Start" (2024). In July 2025, Tyla released the four-track extended play WWP (marketed as We Wanna Party), which she described as a "bridge to the new album" and as material she "needed to let out before the album came".

In a February 2026 interview with Rolling Stone, Tyla discussed the evolution of her mindset leading into A*Pop, stating: "Me being in it, I feel so different to how I felt during the first album... I'm just excited for my new one that's coming this year. Just to see how different it is—like, what's this Tyla now?" Attributing this shift to personal growth, she added: "I've been through stuff. I don't know, I feel like a woman. I'm 24... I feel like a woman".

== Writing and recording ==
Tyla began working on A*Pop in 2025, with recording sessions taking place primarily in Los Angeles and Barcelona. In an interview with Variety in August of that year, she explained: "I had more time to work on this album than I did the first, so I have a lot of songs". Comparing the writing process to her first album, she described herself as "living what [she is] singing" which feels "way more personal".

Speaking to Rolling Stone the following year, Tyla described herself as initially "not knowing what she wanted [A*Pop] to sound like [sic]", but knew that as she lived through the creation of the album it was going to "fall into place". She explained that a big part of getting the album right was to allow herself to "dive into things and try whatever", contrary to her "perfectionist instincts". Tyla described the experience of creating the album as making her feel like a "real artist", as she was able to create a "world around things" and see the project through from "beginning to end".

== Composition ==
"I've always wanted to be this pop star, but I hated feeling like I had to tailor myself to pop. I wanted to tailor pop to me instead. I bring the 'A' to pop, it's African pop. African music is pop music."

— Tyla, on her intentions with A*Pop

A*Pop incorporates elements of African pop, R&B, pop, electropop, amapiano, and dance. Tyla intended for the album to feel carefree, with lyrical content that was not too deep, allowing listeners to feel good within themselves without having to think. The album's composition draws heavily from Tyla's African heritage, featuring what she describes as music that is "very percussive" and "just a vibe", while merging influences from a range of other genres without creative limitations. It incorporates popiano on the tracks "Feel Something" and "I Don't Care", while "Fairytale" samples the South African group Liquideep's song of the same name. The track "Crazy of Me" features lyrics sung Zulu by its featured artist, South African singer MaWhoo, while "I Don't Care" contains an opening and closing sung in Xhosa by South African singer Babalwa M.

Through A*Pop, Tyla sought to challenge conventional perceptions of African pop by embracing a broad range of musical influences while remaining authentic to her South African identity. She aims to convey that Africa should not be viewed as separate from global pop culture, but rather as an integral part of it. In an interview with Ebony, Tyla stated: "Coming from where I come from, I am literally cutting down these bushes as I go. I'm creating it as I go. A*Pop is so important to me because there are just so many layers to pop. It's so broad".

== Release and promotion ==
=== Marketing and touring ===
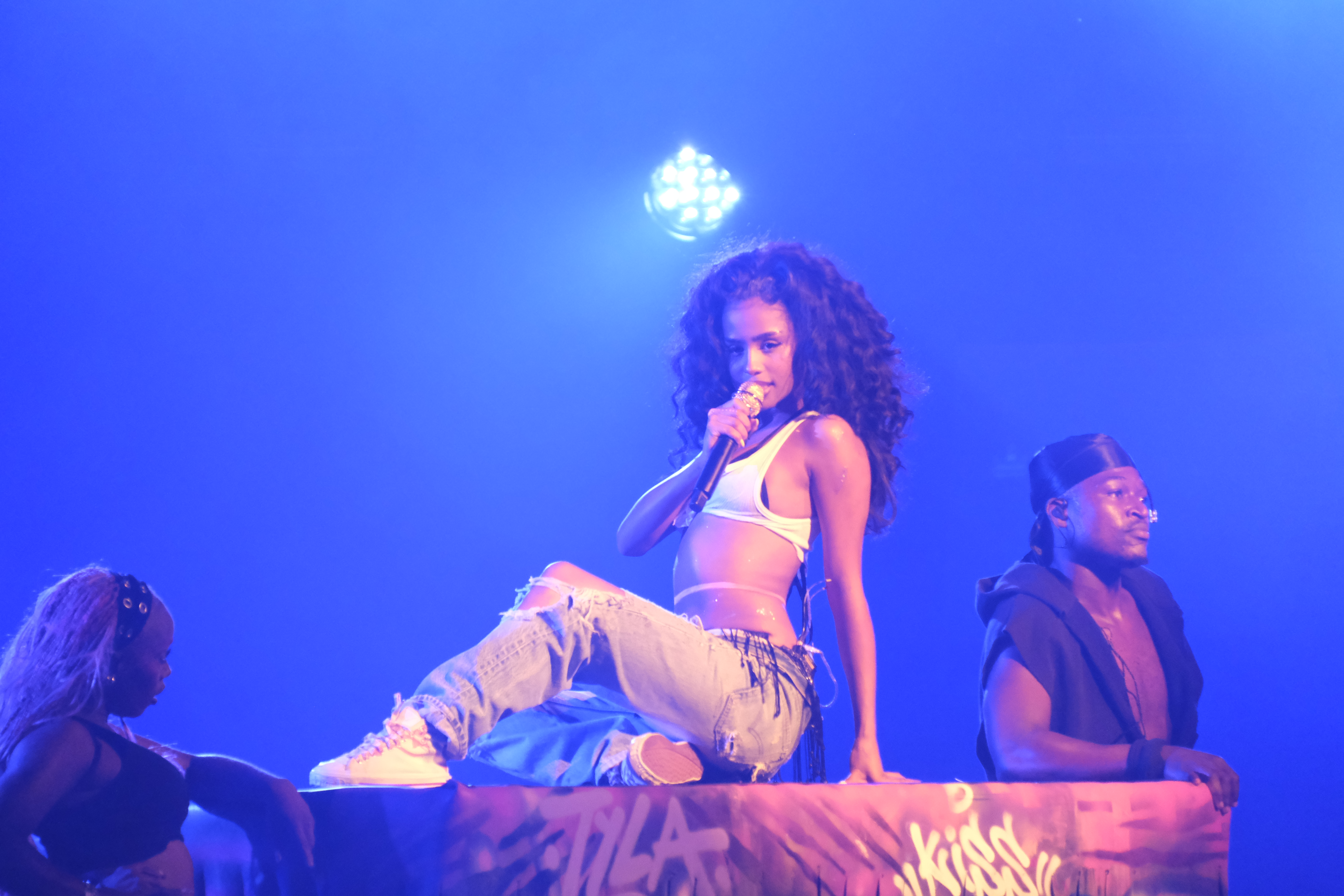
Tyla performing at the Montreux Jazz Festival 2026

On 1 February 2026, while attending the 68th Annual Grammy Awards, Tyla announced the album's title, and stated that it would be released in the summer. On 9 February, Tyla teased an initial track list for A*Pop on her Instagram. On 22 April, Tyla announced that A*Pop would be released on 24 July 2026, and made the album available for pre-order through her official store. The album's track list includes the previously released song "Is It" from WWP (2025). Alongside the announcement, Tyla shared a video trailer for the album which depicts the singer in various outfits and cutscenes of terms associated with the project, including "unapologetic", "confident", and "global". On 15 July, Tyla revealed the album's final track list on her social media, sharing a video set in a backlit room in which she spray-painted the title of each track onto a wall using fluorescent paint. During the album's release week, Tyla partnered with TikTok on an A*Pop-themed in-app experience, where users could watch album-related videos, share fan content, and complete challenges to unlock an "exclusive Tyla profile frame".

On 3 July 2026, Tyla headlined Afro Nation in Portugal, performing tracks such as "Is It", "She Did It Again", and "Chanel" from A*Pop. The production was heavily themed around the album, featuring its title spray-painted in neon green both around the stage and on Tyla's body. During her set, she also spray-painted the phrase "21 Days Til A*Pop" on a mirror. Subsequently, on 8 July, Tyla took to the stage at the Montreux Jazz Festival. She was featured in Vevo's Official Live Performance concert series, delivering a performance of "Is It Love", alongside her guitarist Ari O'Neal, and "She Did It Again". These performances were published to her YouTube channel on 23 and 25 July, respectively. On 24 July, she showcased tracks from A*Pop as part of Today's Citi Concert Series. The following day, Tyla headlined the WNBA All-Star Game Halftime Show, where she performed a set list of songs, including "Chanel". On 27 July, Tyla announced that she would be embarking on the A*Pop World Tour, which will visit Africa, Europe, the United Kingdom, and the United States. The tour will feature 34 dates, taking place between October 2026 and January 2027.

=== Singles and videos ===
On 24 October 2025, Tyla released "Chanel" as the lead single from the album. Its music video was released on the same day and was directed by Aerin Moreno. The track experienced commercial success, reaching number 15 on the UK Singles Chart, number 43 on the US Billboard Hot 100, and number 11 on the Billboard Global 200. At the 52nd Annual American Music Awards, "Chanel" won the award for Social Song of the Year. On 17 April 2026, the album's second single "She Did It Again" featuring Swedish singer-songwriter Zara Larsson was released. The music video was released simultaneously with the song, and was directed by Aerin Moreno. The song reached number 40 in the United Kingdom, number 59 in the United States, and number two in Sweden.

"Is It Love" was released as the third single on 18 June 2026. The song became Tyla's fourth number one on the Billboard U.S. Afrobeats Songs chart, extending her record as the artist with the most number ones on the chart. "That Girl" was sent to Italian radio alongside the album's release on 24 July as the fourth single. A music video for "That Girl" was released on 29 July 2026. The video features Tyla exploring an animated city inspired by the 1992 film Cool World alongside her 2D counterpart. The video ended up garnering huge controversy online due to allegations from fans who claimed that the animations featured in the video were AI generated.

== Critical reception ==
Professional ratings
Aggregate scores
Source	Rating
AnyDecentMusic?	6.9/10
Metacritic	79/100
Review scores
Source	Rating
AllMusic	4/5 stars
The Arts Desk	3/5 stars
Beats Per Minute	7.3/10
Clash	8/10
The Guardian	4/5 stars
NME	3.5/5 stars
Pitchfork	7.2/10

According to the review aggregator Metacritic, A*Pop received "generally favorable reviews" based on a weighted average score of 79 out of 100 from eight critic scores. The review aggregator site AnyDecentMusic? compiled nine reviews and gave the album a weighted average score of 6.9 out of 10, based on their assessment of the critical consensus.

Writing for The Guardian, Michael Cragg described Tyla's intentions with the album as being to "transport us back to more carefree times", describing her voice as "characterful" and "suiting every mood" which allows her to "nimbly traverse genres". He highlighted her ability to balance the album's blend of genres while maintaining herself as its central focus, and concluded that the album is a "bold statement of intent". Temiloluwa Adeyemo of Clash wrote that A*Pop's defining quality is "intention", where "South African influences sit naturally alongside global pop ambitions". Adeyemo described Tyla's collaboration with Liquideep on the track "Fairytale" as "feeling like a meaningful conversation between generations", and the collaborations with artists MaWhoo and Babalwa M as strengthening the album's South African influences. She concluded that A*Pop avoids chasing trends, and instead focuses on Tyla's melodic instincts, her ability to make simplicity "feel powerful", and the album's personable nature where the singer is "stepping fully into her own world and inviting everyone else inside".

In a review for AllMusic, Paul Simpson wrote that A*Pop "reflects Tyla's growth as a person" and has a "tougher, grittier, and at times more challenging sound" than her debut album. Simpson highlighted "Kiss" as a standout track, describing it as "immediately danceable", while defining "Feel Something" as having some of the album's "most experimental production" with Tyla's "passionate vocals" making the track fall into place. Simpson noted that the album's final third is closer to Tyla's signature amapiano sound, concluding overall that A*Pop is a "much riskier and more personal effort" than her debut, which after a "few listens" reveals itself to be equally worthwhile. Writing for NME, Kyann-Sian Williams noted a contrast between the album's ambitious rollout and its content, which she described as a "surprisingly restrained collection of slow-burning love songs". Williams wrote that the album's stronger moments go beyond the "intoxicating blend of amapiano, R&B and glossy pop", specifying the tracks "Is It", "Chanel", and "She Did It Again" which she described as "undeniable earworms". She concluded that A*Pop "largely settles for polishing what already worked" on Tyla's debut album instead of breaking new ground. Similarly, Mary Chiney of Beats Per Minute noted a contrast between the album's "enormous" rollout and its actual content, which she described as "careful" and a "refinement of the sound she already had". Chiney wrote that the album's African influences stem more from its featured artists than from its lyrical content, and singled out "Is It" as showcasing the album's strongest songwriting.

In a review for The Arts Desk, Joe Muggs suggested that although A*Pop is "excellently constructed", the current "incredible" creative output from other African artists "eclipses it". Muggs wrote that other recent amapiano hits are "bigger, lusher, more imaginative" and concluded that "while it’s great to hear a pop album that sounds like this, the real revolution is still happening elsewhere". Writing for Pitchfork, E.R. Pulgar described the album as "no radical reinvention" but praised the incorporation of different genres and Tyla's ambition, stating "there's something appealing about a pop diva who's unreachable enough to keep us guessing and ambitious enough to keep us listening".

== Commercial performance ==
In South Africa, A*Pop became Tyla's biggest first-day album debut on Spotify, with 593,000 streams, surpassing the 409,000 first-day streams of her self-titled debut album. Additionally, the album reached number one on the South Africa Apple Music albums chart on its first-day of release, while a number of its tracks occupied the top ten of the South Africa Apple Music songs chart.

In the United States, A*Pop debuted at number 43 on the Billboard 200; additionally it placed at number ten on the Billboard Top R&B/Hip-Hop Albums chart and number one on the Billboard World Albums chart. According to Hits, the album sold 16,966 copies in its first week in the United States, consisting of 6,247 physical copies, 138 track-equivalent units, and 10,582 streaming-equivalent units.

In the United Kingdom, A*Pop debuted at number 43 on the UK Albums Chart, with 3,270 album-equivalent units earned in its first week. It also placed at number three on the UK R&B Albums chart. In Scotland, the album reached number 36 on the Scottish Albums Chart. In Oceania, the album reached number 28 in Australia, and number 21 in New Zealand. In Europe, the album reached number 37 in Germany,, number 56 in France, and number 64 in the Netherlands. A*Pop also appeared on component charts in Japan, reaching number 79 on the Download Albums chart, and number 20 on the Western Albums chart.

== Track listing ==
Standard track listing
No.	Title	Writer(s)	Producer(s)	Length
1.	"Is It Love"	Richard Isong; Cole Ostrin; Bibi Bourelly; Tyla Seethal; Douglas Ford	Ostrin; P2J; Troy Taylor^{[v]}	3:07
2.	"That Girl"	Seethal; Isong; Ostrin; Ford; Bourelly	Ostrin; P2J; Taylor^{[v]}	2:56
3.	"Kiss"	Seethal; Ian Kirkpatrick; Isong; Ford; Bourelly	Kirkpatrick; P2J; Taylor^{[v]}	3:20
4.	"Is It"	Seethal; Samuel Awuku; Ariowa Irosogie; Imani Lewis; Kaine; Corey Marlon Lindsay-Keay	Sammy Soso; Ari PenSmith; Believve; Mocha Bands; Taylor^{[v]}	2:44
5.	"Fairytale" (featuring Liquideep)	Jonathan Hamilton	Hamilton; Thabo "Ryzor" Shokgolo; Taylor^{[v]}	3:28
6.	"Double Blind"	Seethal; Isong; Barbara Boko; Edith Nelson	P2J; DameDame; Taylor^{[v]}	2:28
7.	"Feel Something"	Seethal; Isong; Tim Friedrich; L. Leibfried; Jason Boyd	P2J; Sucuki; Loof; Taylor^{[v]}	3:32
8.	"Right Now"	Seethal; Isong; Akeel Henry; Ford; Boyd; Bourelly	Henry; P2J; Taylor^{[v]}	3:05
9.	"Mr. Nonchalant"	Seethal; Awuku; Lewis; Irosogie; Lindsay-Keay	Soso; Taylor^{[v]}	2:17
10.	"She Did It Again" (featuring Zara Larsson)	Larsson; Seethal; Awuku; Irosogie; Lewis; Lindsay-Keay; Uzoechi Emenike; Zikai; Helena Gao; Brayton Bowman	PenSmith; Mocha Bands; Believve; Soso; Taylor^{[v]}; Margo XS^{[v]}	3:33
11.	"Chanel"	Kirkpatrick; Ford; Bourelly; Isong	Kirkpatrick; P2J	3:08
12.	"Crazy of Me" (featuring MaWhoo)	Seethal; Isong; Ford; Bourelly; Awuku; Lewis; Irosogie; Lindsay-Keay; Thandeka Ngema; Stacey Bereng	P2J	4:12
13.	"I Don't Care" (featuring Babalwa M)	Seethal; Keven Wolfsohn; Paul Bogumil Goller; Dayo Olatunji; Babalwa Mavuso	The Elements; Taylor^{[v]}	3:12
14.	"Hot Tubs"	Seethal; Awuku; Lewis; Irosogie; Lindsay-Keay	Soso^{[v]}; PenSmith^{[v]}; Mocha^{[v]}; Believve^{[v]}	2:57
Total length:				43:59

Japanese CD edition
No.	Title	Writer(s)	Length
15.	"Selfish" (with Stryv)	Seethal; Hamid Bashir; Bas van Daalen; Arthur Remond; Malachi Cohen	2:27
Total length:			46:26

Target LP edition bonus 7"
No.	Title	Length
15.	"Better Than This"	3:08

=== Notes ===
- ^{^[v]} denotes a vocal producer.

== Personnel ==
The credits are adapted from Tidal.

=== Musicians ===
- Tyla – performance
- Richard Isong – programming (tracks 1–3, 6–8, 11, 12)
- Cole Ostrin – programming (1, 2)
- Bibi Bourelly – background vocals (1, 11)
- Ian Kirkpatrick – programming (3, 11)
- Ryzor – programming (5)
- Ziyon – programming (5)
- Barbara Boko – programming (6)
- Edith Nelson – programming (6)
- Louis Leibfried – programming (7)
- Tim Friedrich – programming (7)
- Akeel Henry – programming (8)
- Samuel Awuku – programming (9, 10, 15)
- Ariowa Irosogie – programming (10)
- Corey Marlon Lindsay-Keay – programming (10)
- Imani Lewis – programming (10)
- Dougie F – background vocals (11)
- Stacey – guitar (12)
- Keven Wolfsohn – programming (13)
- Paul Bogumil Goller – programming (13)

=== Technical ===
- Charlie Rolfe – engineering (1–11, 13), engineering assistance (12)
- Adam Lunn – engineering (1–4)
- Ryzor – engineering (5)
- Ziyon – engineering (5)
- Oscar Cornejo – engineering (12)
- Aaron Jahnke – engineering assistance (1, 2, 4, 9, 11, 13)
- Austin Christy – engineering assistance (8)
- Michael Deano – engineering assistance (8)
- Dani Val – engineering assistance (9)
- Mattia Visco Comandini – engineering assistance (9)
- Paolo Meloni – engineering assistance (9)
- Katie Foreman – engineering assistance (11, 14)
- Leandro Hidalgo – mixing
- Aidan Duncan – mixing assistance
- Javier Ruben De Vries – mixing assistance
- Colin Leonard – mastering

== Charts ==
Chart performance
Chart (2026)	Peak position
Australian Albums (ARIA)	28
Belgian Albums (Ultratop Flanders)	173
Belgian Albums (Ultratop Wallonia)	48
Dutch Albums (Album Top 100)	64
French Albums (SNEP)	56
German Albums (Offizielle Top 100)	37
German Pop Albums (Offizielle Top 100)	16
Japanese Download Albums (Billboard Japan)	79
Japanese Western Albums (Oricon)	20
New Zealand Albums (RMNZ)	21
Nigerian Albums (TurnTable)	77
Portuguese Albums (AFP)	64
Scottish Albums (Official Charts)	36
Spanish Albums (Promusicae)	89
Swiss Albums (Schweizer Hitparade)	19
UK Albums (Official Charts)	43
UK R&B Albums (Official Charts)	3
US Billboard 200	43
US Top R&B/Hip-Hop Albums (Billboard)	10
US World Albums (Billboard)	1

== Release history ==
Release history
Region	Date	Format(s)	Edition(s)	Label(s)	Ref.
Various	24 July 2026	CD; LP; music download; streaming	Standard	FAX; Epic	
Japan	24 July 2026	CD	Japanese	Sony Music Japan	
