= Getting Late =

Getting Late or It's Getting Late may refer to:

- "Getting Late" (Floetry song), 2003 song by English neo soul group Floetry
- "Getting Late" (Tyla song), 2019 song by South African singer Tyla
- It's Gettin' Late, 1985 song by American rock band the Beach Boys
