= That Girl (Tyla song) =

2026 single by Tyla

Single by Tyla

from the album A*Pop
- Released: 24 July 2026
- Genre: Afropop; R&B
- Length: 2:58
- Label: FAX; Epic
- Songwriters: Tyla Laura Seethal; Bibi Bourelly; Douglas Orcher; Richard Isong; Cole Ostin
- Producers: P2J; Coles YoursTruly; Douglas Ford

Tyla singles chronology
"Is It Love" (2026)	"That Girl" (2026)

Music video
- "That Girl" on YouTube

"That Girl" is a song by South African singer Tyla from her second studio album A*Pop (2026). The song was released on 24 July 2026 through FAX and Epic Records alongside the album, and was sent to radio in Italy the same day.

== Background and release ==
"That Girl" was officially released alongside Tyla’s second studio album A*Pop as the album's second track. It serves as the album's fourth original single and fifth overall (including Is It from WWP).

"That Girl" was officially sent to American radio stations as the album's fourth single on 27 July 2026. An official music video was released through Tyla's YouTube channel on 4 August 2026. On 17 October 2026, a new music video was released, with the former being renamed to "Biuro Version".

== Live performance and impact ==
On 24 July, Tyla performed the song live on the American daytime television show, Today. Her performance was praised by critics, and sparked a dance challenge on TikTok inspired by the South African walk style called "Phara Walk".

== Personnel ==
Adapted from Spotify.

- Tyla – singer, songwriter, performer
- P2J – songwriter, producer
- Bibi Bourelly – songwriter
- Cole Ostrin – songwriter, producer
- Douglus Orcher – songwriter, producer
- Leandro Hildago – sound engineer
- Colin Leonard – master engineer

== Charts ==
Chart performance for "That Girl"
Chart (2026)	Peak position
New Zealand Hot Singles (RMNZ)	5
Nigeria (TurnTable Top 100)	41
UK Afrobeats (Official Charts)	2
South Africa Streaming (TOSAC)	5
