= Solace (disambiguation) =

Solace, from Old French solas, from Latin sōlācium "consolation", meaning comfort or consolation in a time of distress.

Solace may also refer to:

== Films ==
- Solace (2006 film), a South Korean romantic drama
- Solace (2015 film), an American mystery thriller
- Quantum of Solace, a James Bond film named after the Ian Fleming short story, released in October 2008

== Music ==
- Solace (band), a heavy metal band from New Jersey, USA
- Solace (Joplin), a 1909 habanera by Scott Joplin

=== Albums ===
- Solace (Ion Dissonance album), a 2005 music album by Canadian metal band Ion Dissonance
- Solace (Jakob album), a 2006 music album by Jakob
- Solace (Lengsel album), a 2000 music album by the Norwegian metal band Lengsel
- Solace (Sarah McLachlan album), a 1991 music album by Sarah McLachlan
- Solace (Xavier Rudd album), a 2004 music album by Xavier Rudd
- Solace (Earl Sweatshirt EP), 2015
- Solace (Uncle Waffles EP), 2023
- Solace (Rüfüs Du Sol album), a 2018 album by Rüfüs Du Sol
- Solace, a 2021 album by Neurotech

=== Songs ===
- "Solace", single by Play Dead with "Isabel", 1984
- "Solace", song by Enya from Dark Sky Island
- "Solace", song by Imelda May from 11 Past the Hour
- "Solace", by The Sea Urchins, 1988

== Other uses ==
- The UK Society of Local Authority Chief Executives and Senior Managers is known as 'Solace'
- The USS Solace (AH-2), (AH-5) was the name of two United States Navy hospital ships.
- Solace Corporation (formerly Solace Systems), a company based in Kanata, Ontario, Canada that manufactures and sells messaging routers.
- "Quantum of Solace", a James Bond short story by Ian Fleming. Part of the For Your Eyes Only collection
