= BET Award for Best International Act =

American entertainment award category

BET Awards for Best International Act
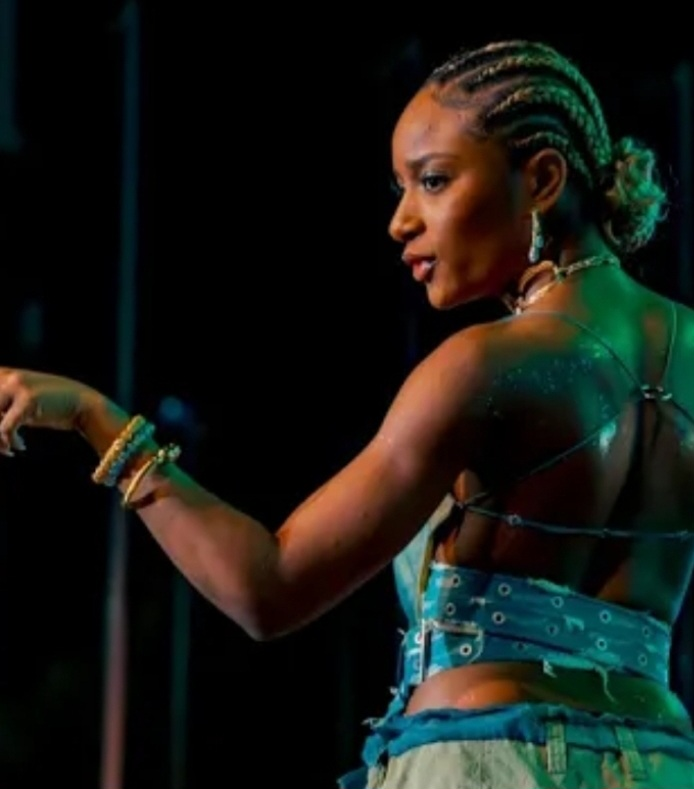
- Ayra Starr is the most recent recipient
- Country: United States
- Presented by: BET Awards
- First award: 2018
- Currently held by: Ayra Starr (2025)

The BET Award for Best International Act is an award given to honor the outstanding achievements of international artists from around the world every year.

== Winners and nominees ==
Winners are listed first and highlighted in bold.

=== 2010s ===
Year	Artist	Country	Ref
2018
2018	**Davido**	**Nigeria**	
2018	Tiwa Savage	Nigeria	
2018	Distruction Boyz	South Africa	
2018	Sjava	South Africa	
2018	Cassper Nyovest	South Africa	
2018	Stormzy	UK	
2018	J Hus	UK	
2018	Stefflon Don	UK	
2018	Dadju	France	
2018	Booba	France	
2018	Niska	France	
2018	Fally Ipupa	DR Congo	
2019
2019	**Burna Boy**	**Nigeria**	
2019	Mr Eazi	Nigeria	
2019	Dave	UK	
2019	Giggs	UK	
2019	Aya Nakamura	France	
2019	Dosseh	France	
2019	AKA	South Africa	

=== 2020s ===
Year	Artist	Country	Ref
2020
2020	**Burna Boy**	**Nigeria**	
2020	Dave	UK	
2020	Innoss'B	DRC	
2020	Ninho	France	
2020	S.Pri Noir	France	
2020	Sho Madjozi	South Africa	
2020	Stormzy	UK	
2021
2021	**Burna Boy**	**Nigeria**	
2021	Aya Nakamura	France	
2021	Diamond Platnumz	Tanzania	
2021	Emicida	Brazil	
2021	Headie One	UK	
2021	Wizkid	Nigeria	
2021	Young T & Bugsy	UK	
2021	Youssoupha	France	
2022
2022	**Tems**	**Nigeria**	
2022	Dave	UK	
2022	Dinos	France	
2022	Fally Ipupa	DRC	
2022	Fireboy DML	Nigeria	
2022	Little Simz	UK	
2022	Ludmilla	Brazil	
2022	Major League DJz	South Africa	
2022	Tayc	France	
2023
2023	**Burna Boy**	**Nigeria**	
2023	Ayra Starr	Nigeria	
2023	Aya Nakamura	France	
2023	Central Cee	UK	
2023	Ella Mai	UK	
2023	K.O.	South Africa	
2023	L7nnon	Brazil	
2023	Stormzy	UK	
2023	Tiakola	France	
2023	Uncle Waffles	Swaziland	
2024			
2024	**Tyla**	**South Africa**	
2024	Asake	Nigeria	
2024	Aya Nakamura	France	
2024	Ayra Starr	Nigeria	
2024	BK'	Brazil	
2024	Cleo Sol	UK	
2024	Focalistic	South Africa	
2024	Karol Conká	Brazil	
2024	Raye	UK	
2024	Tiakola	France	
2025			
2025	**Ayra Starr**	**Nigeria**	
2025	Any Gabrielly	Brazil	
2025	Bashy	United Kingdom	
2025	Black Sherif	Ghana	
2025	Ezra Collective	United Kingdom	
2025	Joe Dwet File	France	
2025	MC Luanna	Brazil	
2025	Rema	Nigeria	
2025	SDM	France	
2025	Tyla	South Africa	
2025	Uncle Waffles	Eswatini	
