= Sydney Seethal =

South African content creator (born 2004)

- Born: Sydney Seethal; 3 May 2004 (age 22); Johannesburg, South Africa
- Occupations: Content creator; model
- Years active: 2019–present
- Relatives: Tyla (sister)

Sydney Seethal (born 3 May 2004) is a South African content creator and model. She made her debut runway in L'Oreal Paris Walk Your Worth fashion show in 2024. She was named the face of H&M's Spring/Summer 2025 campaign.

== Early life ==
Seethal was born and raised in Johannesburg, South Africa. She is the youngest of five children. Her siblings include two half sisters, Alaina and Whitney, and two full siblings, Tyla and Tyrese Seethal. Seethal and Tyla created a joint YouTube channel, Sydney and Tyla, intended for a variety of content creation. The channel, however, became inactive after they posted their first, and only mukbang and Q&A video, in August 2020. Both sisters have their own separate channels. Seethal regularly posts a variety of content on her own channel, Sydney Seethal, including travel vlogs, Q&A, and GRWM. Seethal has revealed that at the age of 18, she was a victim of an attempted cellphone robbery, in which she was pushed onto the road.

== Career ==
Seethal began creating content on TikTok in 2019, later attracting international brand collaborations and had more than 1.2 million followers on the platform. In November 2024, she walked in L'Oréal Paris South Africa's Walk Your Worth fashion show in Franschhoek, alongside Lalela Mswane. In March 2025, she was named the face of H&M's Spring/Summer 2025 campaign alongside her sister, Tyla. The campaign also featured FKA twigs and Caroline Polachek and was released as part of H&M's international spring collection.

In September 2025, Seethal appeared on the cover of Sowetan S Mag Heritage issue. In August 2026, she made a TikTok video with Rayasianboy, in which they tested South African dish pap and chakalaka. In September, she collaborated with American streamer 2xrakai in an IRL livestream.

== Personal life ==
Seethal refers to herself as a Christian and God fearing woman. She currently resides in New York City, U.S.
