= Billboard Music Award for Top Afrobeats Song =

Music award for afrobeats

- Awarded for: Afrobeats music songs
- Country: United States
- Presented by: Billboard
- First award: 2023

Highlights
- Most nominations: Tyla (3)
- Website: billboardmusicawards.com

The Billboard Music Award for Top Afrobeats Song award was first introduced at the Billboard Music Award in 2023.

Tyla is currently the most nominated artist in this category, with three nominations.

== Winners and nominees ==
=== 2020s ===
Recipients
Year	Winner(s)	Song	Nominees	Ref.
2023	Rema & Selena Gomez	"Calm Down"	Ayra Starr – "Rush"; Libianca – "People"; Oxlade – "Ku Lo Sa"; Victony, Rema, & Tempoe ft. Don Toliver – "Soweto"	
2024	Tyla	"Water"	Adam Port, Stryv & Malachiii – "Move"; Tems – "Me & U"; Tyla – "Truth or Dare"; Tyla, Gunna & Skillibeng – "Jump"	
