= Art (song) =

Single by Tyla

from the album Tyla
- Released: 12 April 2024
- Studio: Geejam (Port Antonio)
- Genre: Amapiano; R&B
- Length: 2:29
- Label: Fax; Epic
- Songwriters: Tyla Seethal; Ariowa Irosogie; Imani Lewis; Corey Marlon Lindsay-Keay; Samuel Awuku; James Mwanza
- Producer: Sammy Soso

Tyla singles chronology
"Truth or Dare" (2024)	"Art" (2024)	"Jump" (2024)

Music video
- "Art" on YouTube

"Art" is a song by South African singer Tyla from her self-titled debut studio album. It was released on 12 April 2024 through Fax and Epic Records, as the album's third single. The R&B-infused amapiano song was produced by Sammy Soso and was accompanied by a music video that premiered on YouTube on the day of the album's release.

== Background and composition ==
Tyla shared a teaser video on social media containing her and Lisa of Blackpink previewing the song in the recording studio before Lisa, the first person to listen to the song, cheers for Tyla as it concludes. Musically the song is an infusion of amapiano and contemporary R&B.

== Music video ==
Directed by Nabil Elderkin, the music video premiered on YouTube on 22 March 2024 and it accumulated over 1 million views on its first day. The music video opens with a painting featuring the singer lounging on a chaise in a sheer red corset dress and clear thigh-high boots. A young man, captivated by the singer, sneaks into the gallery and realizes that she is both the painter and the muse behind the self-portrait. Tyla watches as her portrait transforms into one of him, and she ponders where to hang it among the other men who have fallen under her spell.

== Live performances ==
Tyla performed the song for the first time on American late-night talk show The Late Show With Stephen Colbert in April 2024, her debut appearance on the series. Tyla performed most of the tracks from the record including "Breathe Me" and "Water", and cover songs at the 2024 edition of Summer Sonic Festival in Osaka, Japan on 17 August 2024, and again the following day in Tokyo, she delivered a 45-minutes long performance where she opened with "Safer", followed by "On My Body", which she performed with Becky G. Tyla also performed her non-album singles "Thata Ahh" and "Ke Shy", the latter by Major Lazer and Major League DJz before performing a mash-up of Aaliyah's "Rock the Boat" and her "On and On", followed by "Art", "No.1" and "Truth or Dare", as she went on to perform another non-album single "Bana Ba", then "Breathe Me" and "Jump" before closing with "Water".

== Credits and personnel ==
- Tyla – songwriting, vocals, background vocals, additional vocals and harmonies
- Ari PenSmith – songwriting, vocal production, background vocals, additional vocals and harmonies
- Mocha – songwriting, vocal production, background vocals
- Believve – songwriting, vocal production, background vocals
- Sammy Soso – songwriting, production, vocal production, background vocals
- James Mwanza – keyboards
- Oscar Cornejo – vocal production, recording
- Timothy Ishejamaica Kahwa – recording assistance
- Leandro "Dro" Hidalgo – mixing
- Colin Leonard – mastering

== Charts ==
Chart performance for "Art"
Chart (2024)	Peak position
New Zealand Hot Singles (RMNZ)	18
Nigerian Top 100 (TurnTable)	61
Philippines (Philippines Hot 100)	83
South Africa (TOSAC)	11
UK Singles (Official Charts)	85
UK Afrobeats (Official Charts)	2
US Afrobeats Songs (Billboard)	4
US Hot R&B Songs (Billboard)	8
US World Digital Song Sales (Billboard)	7

== Certifications ==
Certifications for "Art"
Region	Certification	Certified units/sales
New Zealand (RMNZ)	Gold	15,000^{‡}
South Africa (RISA)	Platinum	40,000^{‡}
United States (RIAA)	Gold	500,000^{‡}
^{‡} Sales+streaming figures based on certification alone.

== Release history ==
Release history for "Art"
Region	Date	Format	Label	Ref.
Italy	12 April 2024	Radio airplay	Sony Italy	
