= Solace (Uncle Waffles EP) =

EP by Uncle Waffles
- Released: 11 August 2023
- Genre: Amapiano
- Length: 42:52
- Label: KO-SIGN; Encore Recordings
- Producer: Uncle Waffles; Tony Duardo; Kamto; Khesto; Ice Slide Beats; Shakes & Les

Uncle Waffles chronology
Asylum (2023)	Solace (2023)

Alternative cover

Singles from Solace
- 1. "Echoes" Released: 4 August 2023

Professional ratings
Review scores
Source	Rating
News24	3/5 stars
The Native	7.2/10 stars

Solace (aka An Asylum of Solace) is the third extended play (EP) by a Swazi-born South African based DJ and record producer Uncle Waffles. It was released on 11 August 2023 by KO-SIGN under exclusive license from Encore Recordings, it is a sequel to her second EP Asylum (2023). It was preceded by a single "Echoes", and it features guest appearances from Manana, Lusanda, Tony Duardo, Ice Beats Slide, Murumba Pitch and MaWhoo amongst others.

== Track listing ==
Solace track listing
No.	Title	Writer(s)	Producer(s)	Length
1.	"Echoes" (with Tony Duardo featuring Manana and Luanda)	Lungelihle Zwane; David Hampton; Luanda Ngcobo; Ndumiso Manana; Elize Mubikay Ilunga Hampton	Uncle Waffles; Tony Duardo	4:06
2.	"Peace & Happiness" (with 2Kultured featuring Jandas and Vuyo)	Lungelihle Zwane; Vuyo Nduvu; Khensani Gumbi; Kamogelo Vilakazi	Uncle Waffles; Kamto; Khesto	8:33
3.	"Peacock Revisit" (with Ice Beats Slide featuring Sbuda)	Sbuda Maleather; Lungelihle Vilakazi; Siyabonga Ziphonke Mthembu	Uncle Waffles; Ice Beats Slide	5:26
4.	"Waffles Anthem" (with Shakes & Les featuring Murumba Pitch)	Murumba Pitch; Lungelihle Zwane; Sihle Rick Lukhele; Kamogelo Shakoane	Uncle Waffles; Shakes & Les	8:01
5.	"Khumbula" (with Shakes & Les featuring MaWhoo and Sino Msolo)	Sino Msolo; Lungelihle Zwane; Kamogelo Shakoane; Thandeka Ngema; Sihle Rick Lukhele	Uncle Waffles; Shakes & Les	6:10
6.	"Khula" (with Shakes & Les featuring Optimist Music ZA)	Lungelihle Zwane; Thabo Musa; Kamogelo Shakoane; Sihle Rick Lukhele	Uncle Waffles; Shakes & Lea	6:01
7.	"Solace" (with Ice Beats Slide)	Lungelihle Zwane; Siyabonga Ziphonke Mthembu	Uncle Waffles; Ice Beats Slide	4:35
Total length:				42:52
