= Echoes (Uncle Waffles song) =

Single by Uncle Waffles and Tony Duardo featuring Manana and Lusanda

from the EP Solace
- Released: 4 August 2023
- Genre: Private school 'piano
- Length: 4:06
- Label: KO-SIGN; Encore
- Songwriter(s): Lungelihle Zwane; David Hampton; Luanda Ngcobo; Ndumiso Manana; Elize Mubikay Ilunga Hampton
- Producer(s): Uncle Waffles; Tony Duardo

Uncle Waffles singles chronology
"Yahyuppiyah" (2023)	"Echoes" (2023)

Music video
- "Echoes (Visualizer)" on YouTube

Lyric video
- "Echoes (Official Lyric Video)" on YouTube

"Echoes" is the lead single by Swazi-born South African-based DJ and record producer Uncle Waffles and Tony Duardo taken from the former's third extended play (EP) Solace (2023). It was released on 4 August 2023 by KO-SING PTY LTD under exclusive license from Encore Recordings, it features guest appearances from Manana and Luanda with production handled by the primary artists.

== Composition ==
The single is a neo soul-infused slow jam with private school 'piano beat and amapiano percussions. It starts with harmonious vocals blending effortlessly with Waffles’ atmospheric production, the vocal harmonies are soothing and serene with the emotional chemistry from Manana and Lusanda.

== Credits and personnel ==
- Uncle Waffles — primary artist, vocals, producer, songwriter
- Tony Duardo — primary artist, producer, vocals, songwriter
- Manana — featured artist, vocals, songwriter
- Luanda — featured artist, vocals, songwriter
- Elize Mubikay Ilunga Hampton — songwriter
