= Girl Next Door (Tyla and Ayra Starr song) =

Single by Tyla and Ayra Starr
- Released: 12 May 2023
- Genre: Amapiano; pop; R&B; afrobeats
- Length: 3:02
- Label: Fax; Epic
- Songwriters: Tyla Seethal; Oyinkansola Sarah Aderibigbe; Peace Emmanuel Aderogba Oredope; Corey Marlon Lindsay-Keay
- Producers: P.Priime; Corey Marlon Lindsay-Keay

Tyla singles chronology
"Been Thinking" (2023)	"Girl Next Door" (2023)	"Water" (2023)

Ayra Starr singles chronology
"Stamina" (2023)	"The Saga" (2023)	"Disturbing U" (2023)

Music video
- "Girl Next Door" on YouTube

Official audio
- "Girl Next Door (Official Audio)" on YouTube

"Girl Next Door" is a song by South African singer Tyla and Nigerian singer Ayra Starr. It was released on 12 May 2023 through Fax and Epic Records as a standalone single. Production of the song was handled by P.Priime and Corey Marlon Lindsay-Key. It is a blend of amapiano, contemporary R&B, pop, and afrobeats.

== Credits and personnel ==
- Tyla – primary artist, lead vocals, background vocals, songwriter
- Ayra Starr – featured artist, lead vocals, background vocals, songwriter
- Corey Marlon Lindsay-Keay – songwriter, arranger, vocal producer
- P.Priime – producer, songwriter
- Colin Leonard – mastering engineer

== Charts ==
Chart performance for "Girl Next Door"
Chart (2023)	Peak position
US Afrobeats Songs (Billboard)	35

== Release history ==
Release history for "Girl Next Door"
Region	Date	Format	Label	Ref.
Various	12 May 2023	Digital download; streaming	Fax; Epic	
