= Uncle Waffles =

Southern African musician (born 2000)

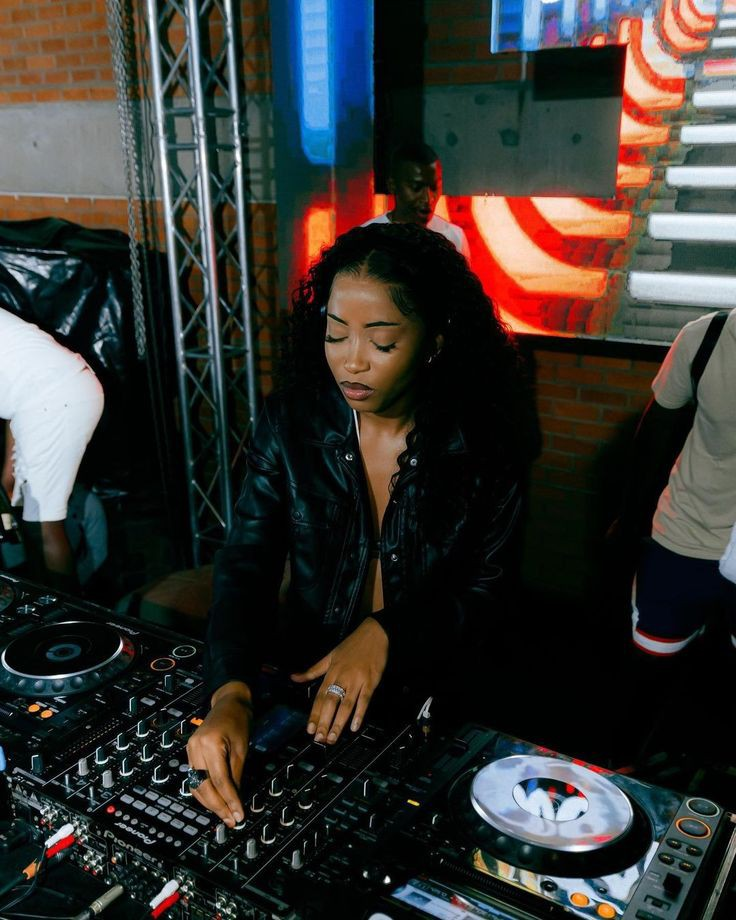
- Uncle Waffles in 2022

Background information
- Born: Lungelihle Zwane; 30 March 2000 (age 26); Eswatini
- Genre: Amapiano
- Occupations: DJ; record producer; dancer
- Years active: 2020–present
- Label: Kreativekornerr

Lungelihle Zwane (born 30 March 2000) known professionally as Uncle Waffles, is a Swazi DJ and record producer based in South Africa. She is noted for her work in the amapiano genre and her dance abilities, with Billboard describing her as the "Princess of Amapiano". Her debut single,"Tanzania", reached number one in South Africa, where it is certified platinum seven times.

== Early life ==
Zwane was born and raised in Eswatini (formerly Swaziland). She didn't know her parents and had been brought up by her grandma through her childhood years, until she reconciled with her mother as a teenager with whom she had a strained relationship thereafter. Zwane grew up listening to South African house and kwaito music from artists such as Black Coffee, Lebo Mathosa and DJ Kent. Before her success as a DJ, Zwane used to be a television presenter on Studio1 on Eswatini TV, but was replaced in January 2022 after parting from the show. It was here that she first was introduced to DJ'ing by a friend who also worked at the studio, as there was a fifteen-year old set of DJ decks there. She then emigrated to South Africa to attend university.

== Career ==
Uncle Waffles learned how to DJ in 2020 during the COVID-19 lockdowns, and claims to have practiced for eight hours each day. She signed with South African creative agency KreativeKornerr, who managed to book gigs for her in the country's "heavily saturated" music industry. After filling in for a withdrawn DJ at the Zone 6 nightclub in Soweto in October 2021, she gained prominence after a video of her dancing to the song "Adiwele" by Young Stunna during her set went viral and would begin openly endorsing her on the platform. Uncle Waffles soon ventured into music production, and released her debut single "Tanzania" in March 2022 in anticipation of her debut extended play (EP), Red Dragon, which was released later that month. The single, which had reportedly taken her three months to perfect, was ranked by Rolling Stone as the eighth best afropop song of 2022, with critics describing her as "a global ambassador for amapiano". In April 2022, Uncle Waffles embarked on her first-ever tour of the United Kingdom and Ireland. The tour was closely interlinked with a series of shows organized by Piano People, which she headlined alongside DJ Maphorisa and Focalistic, and is deemed the first all-star amapiano tour in the region.

Uncle Waffles released her debut music video for the track "Tanzania" in September 2022. In that same month, Uncle Waffles announced that she would be hosting a residency on BBC Radio 1. She was the only DJ that performed at the 2022 Global Citizen Festival in Accra. She partnered with KFC South Africa to launch an exclusive "Uncle Waffles burger" which was made available for purchase in local branches in December 2022, and later again in September 2023. She then embarked on a concert tour of the United States, and then Australia. British publication Mixmag hailed Uncle Waffles as one of the top breakthrough DJs of the year 2022 worldwide. Streaming platform Audiomack also hailed her as an "#UpNow" artist in March 2023. Uncle Waffles' second EP, Asylum, was released in March 2023 and featured the track "Yahyuppiyah", which had been released as the first single from the project. The EP was certified gold by the Recording Industry of South Africa (RISA) within one week of its release. In April 2023, she became the first amapiano musician to ever perform at the Coachella Valley Music and Arts Festival. Her song "Tanzania" was sampled by American singer Beyoncé in a dance break on the Renaissance World Tour setlist, to which Uncle Waffles reacted with the statement "I'm crying, wow," on Instagram. She was nominated for Best International Act at the 2023 BET Awards. Uncle Waffles released the EP Solace (2023) as the follow-up to Asylum in what she called a double-sided project titled, "An Asylum of Solace". It was supported by the single "Echoes", featuring Tony Duardo, which was released on 4 August 2023.

Her single "Wadibusa" featuring OHP Sage, Pcee & Djy Bizana was released on 17 April 2024. It peaked at No. 4 on the Local Top 100 and No. 11 International Top 200 respectively.

Waffles will embark on her upcoming Less Talk, More Piano Tour, to commence from June 2, 2024, We Love Green, Paris until November 29, Asia.

== Discography ==
=== Extended plays ===
Title	Album details	Certifications
Red Dragon	Released: 16 March 2022; Label: Kreativekornerr; Format: Digital download, streaming	
Asylum	Released: 31 March 2023; Label: Kreativekornerr; Format: Digital download, streaming	RISA: Gold
Solace	Released: 11 August 2023; Label: Kreativekornerr; Format: Digital download, streaming	
4 Da Ho's	Released: 6 December 2024; Label: Kreativekornerr; Format: Digital download, streaming	
4 Da Streets (With Royal MusiQ)	Released: 08 May 2026 Label: Kreativekornerr Format: Digital download, streaming	

=== Singles ===
List of singles as lead artist, with selected chart positions and certifications, showing year released and album name
Title	Year	Peak chart positions		Certifications	Album
Title	Year	SA	UK Afro	Certifications	Album
"Tanzania" (featuring Tony Duardo, Sino Msolo and BoiBizza)	2022	1	—	RISA: 7× Platinum	Red Dragon
"Yahyuppiyah" (Uncle Waffles, Tony Duardo and Justin 99 featuring Pcee, Eeque and Chley)	2023	5	—	RISA: 5× Platinum	Asylum
"Echoes" (featuring Tony Duardo, Manana and Lusanda)	2023	—	—		Solace
"Peacock (Revisit)" (featuring Ice Beats Slide and Sbuda Maleather)	2023	3	—		Solace
"Wadibusa" (with Royal MusiQ featuring OHP Sage, Pcee, & Djy Biza)	2024	7	—		TBA
"Zenzele" (Uncle Waffles, Royal MusiQ & Uncool MC featuring CowBoii & Xduppy)	2025	27	16		4 Da Ho's
"2 Spin Jikeleza" (with Focalistic & Shaunmusiq)	2026	_	_		Non-album single
"—" denotes a recording that did not chart or was not released in that territory.

=== Other charted songs ===
Title	Year	Peak chart positions	Album
Title	Year	SA	Album
"Hayi" (Felo Le Tee featuring Uncle Waffles)	2022	23	Contagious
"Ke Nakwela" (DJ Dadaman, Mellow & Sleazy, Uncle Waffles featuring DJ Maphorisa & Uncool MC)	2024		Bacardi Fest EP
"Jaiva Phezkombede" (Royal MusiQ & Uncle Waffles featuring CowBoii)	2025		The Preparation
"Lwetse 2.0" (Xduppy, Angekebabuye MC, Focalistic & Benzoo featuring Uncle Waffles, DJ Maphorisa & Mluusician)	2026	_	Non-album single

== Tours ==
As a headliner

- Less Talk, More Piano Tour (2024)
- We Love Waffles (2025)

== Awards and nominations ==
		Award		Result
2022	All Africa Music Awards	Best African DJ	Herself	Nominated
2022	All Africa Music Awards	Best Female Artist in Southern Africa	Herself	Nominated
2022	African Muzik Magazine Awards	Best DJ Africa	Herself	Won
2023	African Muzik Magazine Awards	Song of the Year	Herself	Nominated
2023	Soundcity MVP Awards Festival	African DJ of the Year	Herself	Nominated
2023	BET Awards	Best International Act	Herself	Nominated
2023	Headies Awards	Best Southern African Artist of the Year	Herself	Nominated
2023	GQ Men of the Year Awards (SA)	Woman of the Year	Herself	Won
2023	MOBO Awards	Best African Music Act	Herself	Nominated
2023	SA Amapiano Awards	Best Amapiano Music Video	"Tanzania"	Cancelled
2023	SA Amapiano Awards	Best Amapiano Styled Artist	Herself	Cancelled
2023	SA Amapiano Awards	Best Amapiano Newcomer	Herself	Cancelled
2023	SA Amapiano Awards	Best South African Amapiano International Act	Herself	Cancelled
2023	SA Amapiano Awards	Best Amapiano Female Club	Herself	Cancelled
2023	SA Amapiano Awards	Best Amapiano Female Artist	Herself	Cancelled
2024	3Music Awards	African Song of the Year	Herself	Nominated
2024	African Entertainment Awards USA	Best Female Artist - East/South/North Africa	Herself	Nominated
2025	BET International Awards	BET Best International Act	Herself	Nominated
