= Babalwa M =

South African singer-songwriter

- Also known as: Babalwa M
- Born: Babalwa Mavuso; February 25, 1994 (age 32); Orlando, Soweto, South Africa
- Origin: South Africa
- Genre: Amapiano
- Occupation: Singer-songwriter
- Instrument: Vocals
- Years active: 2020–present
- Label: Mavuso Business Solutions

Babalwa Mavuso (born 25 February 1994), professionally known as Babalwa M, is a South African singer-songwriter. Born in Orlando, Soweto and grew up in Protea Glen, Babalwa first gained recognition after releasing her extended play Bayeke in 2020.

== Career ==
Her extended play Pisces was released on 26 April 2024. The song "Pholisa" with Kelvin Momo featuring Stixx and Baby S.O.N, debuted number 3 on both Local and International Charts.

In early August 2024, Babalwa was announced as Isgubhu cover star by Apple Music.

Her studio album Candour, was released on 25 October 2024. "Bo Thata" featuring Stixx and Nvcho debuted number 6 on Local Top 10 Streaming Charts. In addition, "Diala Ngothando" featuring MaWhoo and "Mthuthuzeli" with Yallunder debuted number 21 and 23 respectively.

Babalwa released her studio album Acquiesce, on November 28, 2025. The album entered Apple Top 5 albums charts South Africa at No. 4 and reached No. 1.

== Discography ==
- Bayeke (2020)
- Aluta Continua (2021)
- Pisces (2024)
- Candour (2024)
- Acquiesce (2025)

=== Guest appearances ===
Title	Year	Other artist(s)	Album
"I Don't Care"	2026	Tyla	A*Pop

== Singles ==
=== As lead artist ===
List of singles as lead artist, with selected chart positions and certifications, showing year released and album name
Title	Year	Peak chart positions	Certifications	Album
Title	Year	ZA	Certifications	Album
"Emakhosini" (Babalwa M featuring De Mthuda, Sam Deep)	2023	—		Non-album single
"Maye Maye" (Kelvin Momo, Babalwa M featuring Azana, Stixx)	2023	—		Non-album single
"Thobela" (Stixx, Babalwa M)	2024	—	RISA: Gold	Non-album single
"Melusi" (Mzizi, Balawa M featuring Stixx)	2024	—		Non-album single
"uValo" (Jazzworx, Thukuthela, Babalwa M featuring Dlala Thukzin	2025	—		Non-album single
"—" denotes a recording that did not chart or was not released in that territory.

== Other charted and certified songs ==
List of other charted songs, with selected chart positions and certifications, showing year released and album name
Title	Year	Peak chart positions	Certifications	Album
Title	Year	ZA	Certifications	Album
"Inhilziyo" (Mas Musiq featuring Babalwa M)	2021	—	RiSA: Platinum	Auti 'eSharp
"Kusezo Khanya" (Sam Deep, Playgal featuring De Mthuda, Babalwa M, Sipho Magudulela)	2022	—	RiSA: Platinum	Non-album single
"—" denotes a recording that did not chart or was not released in that territory.

== Achievements ==
=== Basadi in Music Awards ===
Year	Nominee / work	Award	Result	Ref.
2025	"Bothata"	Amapiano Artist of the Year	Won	
2025	"Mthuthuzeli" - Babalwa M and Yallunder	Collaboration of the Year	Nominated	

=== Metro FM Music Awards ===
Year	Nominee / work	Award	Result	Ref.
2025	Herself	Best Female Artist	Nominated	
