= She Did It Again =

Single by Tyla featuring Zara Larsson

from the album A*Pop
- Released: 17 April 2026
- Genre: Dancehall
- Length: 3:33
- Label: Epic; Fax
- Songwriters: Tyla Seethal; Zara Larsson; MNEK; Sammy Soso; Ari PenSmith; Corey Marlon Lindsay-Keay
- Producers: Sammy Soso; Ari PenSmith; Believve; Mocha Bands

Tyla singles chronology
"Chanel" (2025)	"She Did It Again" (2026)	"Game Time" (2026)

Zara Larsson singles chronology
"Stateside + Zara Larsson" (2026)	"She Did It Again" (2026)	"Eurosummer" (Girl's Trip) (2026)

Music video
- "She Did It Again" on YouTube

"She Did It Again" is a song by South African singer Tyla featuring Swedish singer Zara Larsson. It was released on 17 April 2026, as the second single from Tyla's second studio album, A*Pop.

== Background and release ==
"She Did It Again" was initially teased on Tyla's Instagram in February, after she posted a snippet of the beginnings of the song. On 8 April, she shared a teaser for "She Did It Again" on Instagram, featuring a guest artist in a pink wig whose identity was initially hidden. On 15 April, Tyla revealed that the collaborator was Swedish singer Zara Larsson. The song was written by the two singers with the collaboration on writing and producing by Sammy Soso, Ari PenSmith and Corey Marlon Lindsay-Keay.

In an interview with Vanity Fair that same month, Larsson revealed that she heard the song "the night [Tyla] posted the snippet on Instagram", describing her reaction as being "damn, I wish I was on this". In the same interview, Tyla explained that they both went to the studio and played each other their respective music, after which she asked Larsson to be on the track. She explained that the intention with the song was to keep things "sexy, light, and fun", and that collaborating with Larsson "pushes the song further into pop territory without losing what I wanted it to feel like".

== Music video ==
The music video for the song was released simultaneously with the release of the song on Tyla's YouTube channel. Critics likened the choreography and aesthetics of the music video to that of the 2007 single "Beautiful Liar" by singers Beyoncé and Shakira.

== Critical reception ==
Walden Green of Pitchfork called the song a contender for 2026 song of the summer, writing that the song "feels like a celebration".

== Personnel ==
- Tyla – vocals, songwriting
- Zara Larsson – vocals, songwriting
- MNEK – songwriting
- Sammy Soso – producer, songwriting, programmer
- Ari PenSmith – producer, songwriting, programmer
- Believve – producer
- Mocha Bands – producer
- Troy Taylor – vocal producer
- Corey Marlon Lindsay-Keay – songwriting, programmer
- Brayton Bowman – songwriting
- Zikai – songwriting

== Charts ==
=== Weekly charts ===
Weekly chart performance
Chart (2026)	Peak position
Australia (ARIA)	87
Australia Hip Hop/R&B (ARIA)	9
Austria (Ö3 Austria Top 40)	48
Canada Hot 100 (Billboard)	55
Central America Anglo Airplay (Monitor Latino)	10
Croatia International Airplay (Top lista)	42
Estonia Airplay (TopHit)	91
France (SNEP)	110
Germany (GfK)	47
Germany Airplay (BVMI)	33
Global 200 (Billboard)	74
Greece International (IFPI)	28
Honduras Anglo Airplay (Monitor Latino)	1
Ireland (IRMA)	61
Israel TV Airplay (Media Forest)	3
Israel International TV Airplay (Media Forest)	1
Lithuania Airplay (TopHit)	62
Netherlands (Single Top 100)	62
New Zealand Hot Singles (RMNZ)	3
Nicaragua Anglo Airplay (Monitor Latino)	1
Nigeria (TurnTable Top 100)	62
Nigeria Airplay (TurnTable)	28
Norway (VG-lista)	32
Panama Anglo Airplay (Monitor Latino)	10
Portugal (AFP)	125
Romania Airplay (TopHit)	32
South Africa Airplay (TOSAC)	2
South Africa Streaming (TOSAC)	9
Suriname (Nationale Top 40)	4
Sweden (Sverigetopplistan)	2
Switzerland (Schweizer Hitparade)	34
UK Singles (Official Charts)	40
UK Afrobeats (Official Charts)	1
UK Hip Hop/R&B (Official Charts)	5
US Billboard Hot 100	59
US Pop Airplay (Billboard)	22
US Rhythmic Airplay (Billboard)	12
US World Digital Song Sales (Billboard)	2

=== Monthly charts ===
Monthly chart performance
Chart (2026)	Peak position
Romania Airplay (TopHit)	35

== Release history ==
Release dates and formats
Region	Date	Format	Label	Ref.
Various	17 April 2026	Digital download; streaming	Fax; Epic	
United States	28 April 2026	Rhythmic crossover radio	Fax; Epic	
United States	28 April 2026	Contemporary hit radio (original release)	Fax; Epic	
Italy	18 May 2026	Radio airplay	Sony Italy	
United States	18 September 2026	Contemporary hit radio (re-release)	Epic	
