= Jump (Tyla, Gunna, and Skillibeng song) =

Single by Tyla, Gunna, and Skillibeng

from the album Tyla
- Released: 14 May 2024
- Studio: Miloco (London)
- Genre: Afrobeats; dancehall; hip hop
- Length: 2:27
- Label: Epic; FAX
- Songwriters: Tyla Seethal; Ariowa Irosogie; Imani Lewis; Corey Lindsay-Keay; Samuel Awuku; Sergio Kitchens; Emwah Warmington
- Producer: Sammy SoSo

Tyla singles chronology
"Art" (2024)	"Jump" (2024)	"One Call" (2024)

Gunna singles chronology
"WhatsApp (Wassam)" (2024)	"Jump" (2024)	"One of Wun" (2024)

Skillibeng singles chronology
"Missbnasty" (2024)	"Jump" (2024)

Music video
- "Jump" on YouTube

"Jump" is a song by South African singer Tyla, American rapper Gunna and Jamaican rapper Skillibeng, from Tyla's self-titled debut album. The song was written by Tyla, Mocha, Believve, Gunna, Skillibeng, and its producer Sammy SoSo. Musically, "Jump" is a genre fusion of Afrobeats, dancehall and hip hop. It features throbbing bass, amapiano percussion, and a chant of the Zulu language expression "haibo". Tyla reflects on her rise to fame with braggadocio in the lyrics and references Johannesburg, the city where she was born and raised, by its two colloquial names, Joburg and Jozi.

After becoming a trend on the video sharing service TikTok, "Jump" was sent to US rhythmic radio stations on 14 May 2024 as the album's fourth single. Critics complimented Tyla's confident performance in the song, while some were critical of Gunna's appearance. "Jump" charted at number 18 in South Africa and became Tyla's second top-40 entry on the UK Singles Chart. The music video, directed by Nabil, was mainly filmed in the Johannesburg areas of Hillbrow and Soweto, and was regarded by local media as an authentic representation of South Africa.

== Background and release ==
Tyla co-wrote "Jump" with her frequent collaborators Believve, Mocha, Ari PenSmith, and the song's producer Sammy Soso. According to Soso, the group's diverse range of cultures unintentionally created a genre fusion on "Jump". During Tyla's visit to Jamaica in October 2023, she relistened to the song and felt it needed a Jamaican sound and informed her team to contact Skillibeng for a feature. At the time, she had also spoken to Gunna about a collaboration. Impressed by his interest in African music and culture, Tyla thought Gunna would elevate "Jump" and give it a rougher hip hop sound. The song was recorded at Miloco Studios in London.

"Jump" was released by FAX and Epic Records on 22 March 2024 as the ninth track on Tyla's self-titled debut studio album. The accompanying lyric video was shared on YouTube the same day. Although "Truth or Dare" and "Art" were being promoted as singles from Tyla at the time, "Jump" became popular on streaming platforms, increasing its stream tally by nearly 10% for four consecutive weeks. It was boosted by two viral dance trends on the video sharing service TikTok. The first was a dance created by Zoe Baptiste, while the second was based on the opening of Tyla's first verse, "They never had a pretty girl from Joburg / See me now, and that's what they prefer". On 14 May 2024, "Jump" was serviced to rhythmic contemporary radio stations in the United States as the fourth single from the album. The song was sent for radio airplay in Italy on 7 June 2024.

== Composition and lyrics ==
"Jump"
A 14-second sample of "Jump" featuring the "haibo!" party chant and Tyla performing the single-syllable chorus with a rap-sung cadence.

"Jump" is a genre fusion of Afrobeats, dancehall and hip hop. The song features echoing log drums and percussion definitive of the amapiano genre, and R&B chords. Beats Per Minute's Lucas Martins describes it as being "the most trap-adjacent production" on the album. Driven by a dancehall riddim and throbbing bass, it eschews the more easy-going sound of Tyla's other music.

The song opens with a rapped intro by Skillibeng in which he compliments the singer, calling her "an original gyal". Tyla then performs the first verse with braggadocio, and the single-syllable chorus in a rap-sung cadence. Hip hop air horns are introduced in the chorus, along with the party chant, "haibo!", a Zulu expression for shock or disbelief. Gunna raps the second verse promising to fulfil Tyla's desires and buy her jewellery. The song ends with an outro by Skillibeng.

The lyrics find Tyla reflecting on her rise to fame with confidence. Tyla said she is "flexing on people" in the song. In an interview for Apple Music, she explained: "I really just wanted to tell people who I am, and I had to show my confidence through the song." Tyla also wanted to represent Johannesburg with "Jump", and referenced the city in the song by its colloquial names, Jo'burg and Jozi.

== Critical reception ==
"Jump" was generally well received by critics upon release. Writing for Stereogum, Katherine St. Asaph believed Tyla "loosened up" with the song and proved she had both "playfulness and poise". Robin Murray of Clash called it "a superb demonstration of fiery pop magic". Variety's Thania Garcia wrote that Tyla grew in confidence and successfully accentuated her phrasing, citing the word "prefer" in the first verse as an example. Garcia named it the track on the album most likely to become "a party anthem". Olive Pometsey of The Face said the song has "an elevated, sexier approach to Tyla's typically breezy sound, complete with a hook that might just get stuck in your head all day."

In a review for Billboard, Kyle Denis and Michael Saponara deemed it the album's "genre-bending" standout track and likened Tyla's cadence to the relaxed style of Rihanna. They believed it "continues her track record of steamy come-hither bops that keep her in complete control at all times". On the other hand, Joshua Minsoo Kim of Resident Advisor felt the song was a trend-chasing outlier on the album and wrote that Tyla adopts "an awkward patois". Pitchfork's Julianne Escobedo Shepherd found Gunna's appearance "a bit confusing" and criticized his rhyming, but called the track "a black-light banger". Tai Saint-Louis of HipHopDX said Gunna's feature was squandered because he sounds "barely recognizable".

== Commercial performance ==
Following the album's release in March 2024, "Jump" debuted at number 18 on The Official South African Charts. In the United States, it debuted at number six on the Afrobeats Songs chart. Boosted by two viral dance trends on TikTok, the song steadily grew in popularity and received 2 million on-demand streams for four consecutive weeks. During the week of 12–18 April, "Jump" received 2.9 million on-demand streams and climbed to number three on the Afrobeats Songs chart. The song debuted at number 49 on US Hot R&B/Hip-Hop Songs, making Skillibeng the first Jamaican to appear on the chart since Popcaan in 2012 with the single "Only Man She Want".

On the UK Singles Chart, "Jump" debuted at number 80 and peaked at number 38 in its fourth week with sales of 12,094 units, becoming Tyla's second UK top-40 single. The song topped the UK Afrobeats Singles Chart for seven consecutive weeks. Elsewhere, "Jump" charted at number 49 in Switzerland, number 51 in the Netherlands, number 57 in Nigeria, number 66 in Ireland, and number 87 in Canada.

== Music video ==
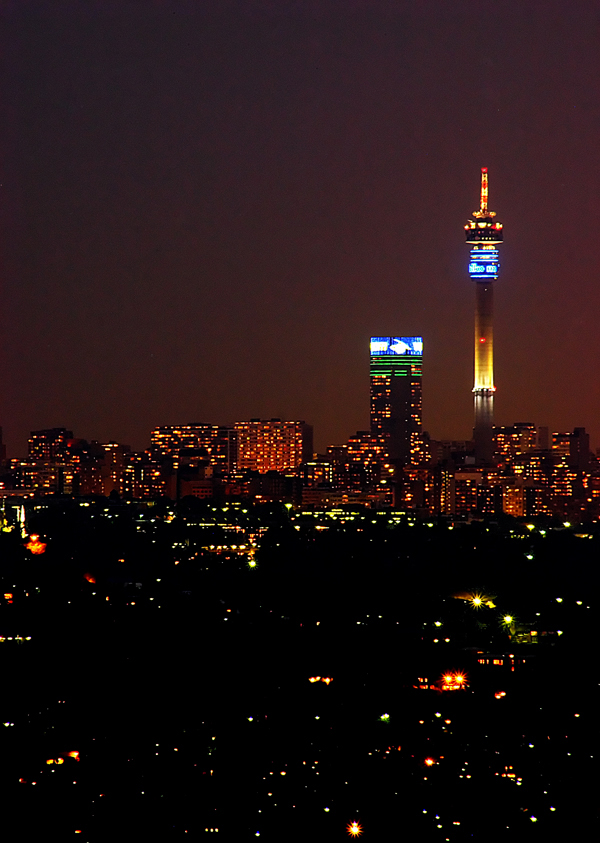
The music video features the iconic Hillbrow Tower (left) in Johannesburg, where Tyla and Gunna are also seen at a Soweto nightclub (right).

The music video for "Jump" was directed by Nabil, who worked with Tyla on the videos for "Truth or Dare" and "Art". Tyla and Gunna's scenes were filmed on 1 May 2024 in Hillbrow, Johannesburg, and Kliptown, Soweto. A segment was also shot at Konka, a nightclub in Soweto. The video includes a new verse by Skillibeng who was filmed separately in Kingston, Jamaica. Nabil worked with the production company Happy Place, as well as South African and Jamaican professionals for the shoot. The music video was released on 20 May 2024.

=== Synopsis ===
The video opens with shots of Tyla and the Hillbrow Tower, an iconic symbol of Johannesburg. She is seen seated in a braiding chair handing a hairpiece to her stylist. It transitions to Skillibeng rapping in a Jamaican location, before returning to Johannesburg where Tyla dances on a shebeen's pool table and a balcony with a DStv satellite dish. Gunna appears driving Tyla through the city in a red lowrider with the tongue and lips logo. Tyla pays homage to Kliptown, dancing in front of a wall with the neighbourhood's name displayed on it. Elderly women are seen playing street soccer and a group of men play morabaraba before throwing the game table over in disagreement.

Throughout the video, people engage in Izikhothane (skothane) dance battles and perform local dances such as the pantsula. Tyla and Gunna are also shown dancing in Konka, and eating snacks popular in South African townships and working-class areas, namely Go-Slo's crisps and Apple Munch refreshers. A brawl occurs in a home where Tyla is seated and a man is thrown through the window. The video ends with the singer stopping a minibus taxi in the street and twerking in front of it.

=== Reception ===
The music video received 2.1 million views on YouTube in its first two days of release. South African media complimented it for being an authentic representation of the country. Sergio Miller of the magazine Bona wrote that Tyla "embraced her heritage while showcasing the most authentic version of South Africa." Emmanuel Esomnofu of OkayAfrica appreciated the "artistic eccentricity" and fast-paced cinematography. He felt the video portrayed the nation in a new and positive light, calling it "a creative alliance that succeeds on all fronts." Independent Online's Oluthando Keteyi believed it was "well executed" and "kept things authentic and filled with nostalgia flavour that can only [be] found in Mzansi."

== Live performances ==
Tyla performed "Jump" alongside Gunna and Skillibeng at the 24th annual BET Awards in Los Angeles, California on 30 June 2024, after receiving the BET Award for Best New Artist. She then attended the Prelude to the 2024 Olympic Games at the Foundation Louis Vuitton in Paris on 25 July 2024, dressed in black velvet Louis Vuitton tracksuits, where she delivered a medly of "Thata Ahh", "Jump" and "Water" dressed in an oversized Louis Vuitton jersey and spandex shorts. Tyla performed most of the tracks from the record including "Breathe Me" and "Water", and cover songs at the 2024 edition of Summer Sonic Festival in Osaka, Japan on 17 August 2024, and again the following day in Tokyo, she delivered a 45-minutes long performance where she opened with "Safer", followed by "On My Body", which she performed with Becky G. Tyla also performed her non-album singles "Thata Ahh" and "Ke Shy", the latter by Major Lazer and Major League DJz before performing a mash-up of Aaliyah's "Rock the Boat" and her "On and On", followed by "Art", "No.1" and "Truth or Dare", as she went on to perform another non-album single "Bana Ba", then "Breathe Me" and "Jump" before closing with "Water".

== Accolades ==
=== Awards and nominations ===
List of awards and nominations for "Jump"
Organization	Year	Award	Result	Ref.
African Entertainment Awards USA	2024	Best Collaboration	Nominated	
Billboard Music Awards	2024	Top Afrobeats Song	Nominated	
NAACP Image Awards	2025	Outstanding International Song	Pending	
Trace Awards	2025	Song of the Year	Pending	
Trace Awards	2025	Best Music Video	Won	

=== Critics lists ===
Name of publisher, name of listicle, year(s) listed, and placement result
Publication	List	Year	Rank	Ref.
NME	The 50 best songs of 2024	2024	13	
Vibe	Song of the Summer	2024	4	

== Credits and personnel ==
Credits are adapted from the liner notes of Tyla.

Recording

- Miloco Studios – London, England

Musicians

- Tyla – songwriting, vocals, background vocals, additional vocals and harmonies
- Gunna – songwriting, vocals
- Skillibeng – songwriting, vocals
- Sammy Soso – songwriting, production, vocal production, background vocals
- Ari PenSmith – songwriting, vocal production, background vocals, additional vocals and harmonies
- Mocha – songwriting, vocal production, background vocals
- Believve – songwriting, vocal production, background vocals
- Oscar Cornejo – vocal production

Technical

- Charlie Rolfe – recording engineer
- Flo Ongonga – recording engineering
- Aidan Duncan – engineering assistance
- Leandro "Dro" Hidalgo – mixing engineer
- Colin Leonard – mastering engineer

== Charts ==
Chart performance for "Jump"
Chart (2024)	Peak position
Canada Hot 100 (Billboard)	87
France Overseas Airplay (SNEP)	30
Global 200 (Billboard)	195
Greece International (IFPI)	31
Ireland (IRMA)	66
Netherlands (Single Top 100)	51
New Zealand Hot Singles (RMNZ)	22
Nigeria (TurnTable Top 100)	57
Portugal (AFP)	179
South Africa (TOSAC)	18
Switzerland (Schweizer Hitparade)	49
UK Singles (Official Charts)	38
UK Afrobeats (Official Charts)	1
UK Hip Hop/R&B (Official Charts)	8
US Afrobeats Songs (Billboard)	3
US Hot R&B/Hip-Hop Songs (Billboard)	42
US Rhythmic Airplay (Billboard)	16
US World Digital Song Sales (Billboard)	6

== Certifications ==
Certifications for "Jump"
Region	Certification	Certified units/sales
Brazil (Pro-Música Brasil)	Gold	20,000^{‡}
Canada (Music Canada)	Gold	40,000^{‡}
New Zealand (RMNZ)	Gold	15,000^{‡}
South Africa (RISA)	Platinum	40,000^{‡}
United Kingdom (BPI)	Silver	200,000^{‡}
United States (RIAA)	Gold	500,000^{‡}
^{‡} Sales+streaming figures based on certification alone.

== Release history ==
Release dates and formats for "Jump"
Region	Date	Format(s)	Label(s)	Ref.
United States	14 May 2024	Rhythmic crossover	Epic; FAX	
Italy	7 June 2024	Radio airplay	Sony Italy	
