= Been Thinking =

Single by Tyla
- Released: 27 January 2023
- Genre: R&B; amapiano; pop; disco; house
- Length: 3:09
- Label: Fax; Epic
- Songwriters: Christopher Stewart; Theron Thomas; William Lovely
- Producers: Theron Thomas; Tricky Stewart; Ph.D-Lovely

Tyla singles chronology
"To Last" (2022)	"Been Thinking" (2023)	"Girl Next Door" (2023)

Music video
- "Been Thinking" on YouTube

"Been Thinking" is a single by South African singer and songwriter Tyla. It was released on 27 January 2023 through Fax and Epic Records. It features production and songwriting from American record producers and songwriters Tricky Stewart and Theron Thomas. It impacted rhythmic contemporary radio in the United States on 31 January 2023, and became her first Billboard-charting song in the region, entering at 36 on the Mainstream R&B/Hip-Hop Airplay chart in May 2023.

== Background and composition ==
"Been Thinking" is an amapiano and pop infused song, which incorporates house and disco, and has elements of R&B and afrobeats. Tyla recorded the song on her first trip to the United States and she had a feeling of great pleasure as she recorded in the same studio Michael Jackson recorded his music in, she went on to state that:

The room was very magical, and when we created that song, it didn’t take that long, but we just knew we wanted to hit.

== Awards and nominations ==
Organization	Year	Award	Recipient or nominee	Result	Ref.
South African Music Awards	2023	Best Produced Music Video	"Been Thinking"	Nominated	

== Charts ==
Chart performance for "Been Thinking"
Chart (2023)	Peak position
US Afrobeats Songs (Billboard)	43
US Mainstream R&B/Hip-Hop Airplay (Billboard)	36
US Rhythmic Airplay (Billboard)	27

== Release history ==
Release history for "Truth or Dare"
Region	Date	Format	Label	Ref.
Various	27 January 2023	Digital download; streaming	Fax; Epic	
United States	31 January 2023	Rhythmic contemporary radio	Fax; Epic	
