= Truth or Dare (Tyla song) =

Single by Tyla

from the album Tyla
- Released: 13 February 2024
- Studio: Miloco (London)
- Genre: Amapiano
- Length: 3:10
- Label: FAX; Epic
- Songwriters: Tyla Seethal; Ariowa Irosogie; Imani Lewis; Corey Marlon Lindsay-Keay; Samuel Awuku; Jamal Europe
- Producer: Sammy SoSo

Tyla singles chronology
"Water" (2023)	"Truth or Dare" (2024)	"Art" (2024)

Music video
- "Truth or Dare" on YouTube

"Truth or Dare" is a song by South African singer Tyla from her 2024 self-titled debut studio album. It was released by FAX and Epic Records as a promotional single from her 2023 self-titled extended play, before impacting rhythmic contemporary radio in the United States on 13 February 2024, as the second single from the album. Written by Tyla, Ariowa Irosogie, Imani Lewis, Corey Marlon Lindsay-Keay, Jamal Europe, and its producer Sammy SoSo, "Truth or Dare" is an amapiano track infused with elements of afrobeats and contemporary R&B influences.

The accompanying music video premiered on YouTube on 2 February 2024. Commercially, "Truth or Dare" peaked at number one in five countries. It reached number four on the U.S. Bubbling Under Hot 100 chart, number eleven in New Zealand, and number fifteen in Japan and Tyla's native South Africa. "Truth or Dare" received gold certifications in Brazil and Canada. It was performed live in multiple countries.

== Background and promotion ==
On 25 November 2023, Tyla teased "Truth or Dare" on Twitter with a video captioned "Truth or Dare. Pre-save, December 1". Written by Tyla, Ari PenSmith, Imani Lewis, Corey Marlon Lindsay-Keay, Jamal Europe and its producer Sammy SoSo, "Truth or Dare" was recorded at Miloco Studios in London, England. It was one of the three promotional singles taken from Tyla's self-titled digital extended play (EP), released on 1 December 2023 by FAX Records and Epic Records.

Tyla announced the release date of her debut self-titled studio album on 1 December 2023 via Instagram. To promote the recording, Tyla released a visualizer via YouTube on 15 December 2023, that was filmed in Portland, Jamaica. Originally scheduled for release on 1 March 2024, the album was then released later that month on 22 March, containing the digital EP. "Truth or Dare" was sent to the rhythmic contemporary radio stations as the second single from the album on 13 February 2024, and it was labeled the most added track of that week with 42 stations. "Truth or Dare" was covered by South Korean singer, Somin of Kard.

== Composition and chart performance ==
"Truth or Dare"
A 18-second sample of "Truth or Dare" by Tyla, where part of the pre-chorus and chorus are heard, an amapiano recording infused with elements of afrobeats.

"Truth or Dare" is three minutes and ten seconds long. The fourth song on the album, it is an amapiano recording, which has been described as a slab of afrobeats by Resident Advisor's Joshua Minsoo Kim. It is an R&B-influenced recording, characterized by guitar riffs, Tyla's "candied" vocals, as well as rhythmic and bass-heavy percussion. In the chorus, Tyla sings about remembering when her then-lover would mistreat her and she challenges him to catch up.

"Truth or Dare" debuted at number one in Korea, Norway, Denmark, Sweden and the Levant. In the United States, the song peaked at number four on the Bubbling Under Hot 100 Singles on the chart dated 6 April 2024. "Truth or Dare" also peaked at number one on the UK Afrobeats Singles Chart. number three on the Billboard U.S. Afrobeats Songs chart, number four on the World Digital Song Sales chart, number 17 on the Rhythmic chart, and number 41 on the Hot R&B/Hip-Hop Songs chart. Elsewhere, it peaked at number 11 in New Zealand and number 15 in Japan and Tyla's native South Africa. "Truth or Dare" was certified Gold in Brazil by Pro-Música Brasil, and in Canada by Music Canada. With over 51 million streams globally on Spotify in April 2024, "Truth or Dare" was the second most streamed song by Tyla, trailing behind "Water" until it was surpassed by "Jump" when it amassed over 100 million streams in June 2024.

== Music video ==
The music video for "Truth or Dare" was directed by Nabil Elderkin, who later worked with Tyla on the videos for "Water (Remix)", "Art", "Jump", and "Breathe Me". It was shot in the Caribbean in December 2023. The music video was released via YouTube on 2 February 2024. As of July 2025, the music video sits on over 42 million views. Tallie Spencer of HotNewHipHop praised Tyla's ability to mix storytelling and visuals.

In the video, Tyla receives a text in the kitchen and links up with her problematic ex-lover; she drives off on an awful journey with him. Approaching the end of the video, Tyla is seen sticking her head out the windows of a moving car, getting her revenge as she speeds away from her then-lover. She gets into a high-speed chasing with an ex who won't let go and the police chase after them. When the ex-lover eventually catches up to Tyla, she steals his keys and walks off, leaving him to deal with the police.

== Live performances ==
Tyla performed a medley of "Water" and "Truth or Dare" on the season 24 finale of the U.S. television series The Voice aired on NBC on 18 December. She also performed a medley of "On and On", "Truth or Dare", and "Water" in Times Square during the 2024 television special Dick Clark's New Year's Rockin' Eve. Tyla performed most of the tracks from the record including "Truth or Dare", "Breathe Me" and "Water", and cover songs at the 2024 edition of Summer Sonic Festival in Osaka, Japan on 17 August 2024, and again the following day in Tokyo, she delivered a 45-minutes long performance where she opened with "Safer", then went on to perform "Truth or Dare", before closing with "Water".

== Accolades ==
Awards and nominations for "Truth or Dare"
Organisation	Year	Category	Result	Ref.
Billboard Music Awards	2024	Top Afrobeats Song	Nominated	

=== Critics lists ===
Name of publisher, name of listicle, year(s) listed, and placement result
Publication	List	Year	Rank	Ref.
Billboard Philippines	The 50 Best Songs of 2024	2024	—N/a	
Pitchfork	The 100 Best Songs of 2024	2024	18	

== Credits and personnel ==
Credits are adapted from the liner notes of Tyla.

Recording

- Miloco Studios – London, England

Musicians

- Tyla – songwriting, vocals, background vocals, additional vocals and harmonies
- Ari PenSmith – songwriting, background vocals, additional vocals and harmonies, vocal production
- Mocha – songwriting, background vocals, vocal production
- Believve – songwriting, background vocals, co-production, vocal production
- Sammy SoSo – songwriting, background vocals, production, vocal production
- Jamal Europe – songwriting
- Adenine Zen – choir vocals and harmonies
- Shanice Steele – choir vocals and harmonies
- Sincerely Wilson – choir vocals and harmonies
- Greg Dwight – choir vocals and harmonies
- Mari Songs – choir vocals and harmonies
- Ivie Ideh – choir vocals and harmonies
- PJ Greaves – choir vocals and harmonies
- Paula – choir vocals and harmonies

Technical

- Charlie Rolfe – recording engineer
- Leandro "Dro" Hidalgo – mixing engineer
- Colin Leonard – mastering engineer

== Charts ==
Chart performance for "Truth or Dare"
Chart (2023–2024)	Peak position
Japan Hot Overseas (Billboard Japan)	15
Netherlands (Single Tip)	5
New Zealand Hot Singles (RMNZ)	11
South Africa (TOSAC)	15
UK Afrobeats (Official Charts)	1
US Bubbling Under Hot 100 (Billboard)	4
US Afrobeats Songs (Billboard)	3
US Hot R&B/Hip-Hop Songs (Billboard)	41
US Rhythmic Airplay (Billboard)	17
US World Digital Song Sales (Billboard)	4

== Certifications ==
Certifications for "Truth or Dare"
Region	Certification	Certified units/sales
Brazil (Pro-Música Brasil)	Gold	20,000^{‡}
Canada (Music Canada)	Gold	40,000^{‡}
New Zealand (RMNZ)	Platinum	30,000^{‡}
United Kingdom (BPI)	Silver	200,000^{‡}
United States (RIAA)	Gold	500,000^{‡}
^{‡} Sales+streaming figures based on certification alone.

== Release history ==
Release history for "Truth or Dare"
Region	Date	Format	Label	Ref.
Various	1 December 2023 (Note: Release as promotional single.)	Digital download; streaming	FAX; Epic	
United Kingdom	1 December 2023	Digital download; streaming	Sony; Since '93; RCA	
United States	13 February 2024	Rhythmic contemporary radio	FAX; Epic	
