= Getting Late (Tyla song) =

2019 song by Tyla

Single by Tyla featuring Kooldrink
- Released: 25 October 2019
- Recorded: 2019
- Genre: Amapiano; pop; EDM; contemporary R&B
- Length: 4:14
- Label: Fax; Epic
- Songwriters: Munashe Kugarakuripi; Thato Nzimande; Kooldrink; Garth Von Glehn
- Producers: Rogan Kelly; Kooldrink

Tyla featuring Kooldrink singles chronology
"Getting Late" (2019)	"Overdue" (2021)

Music video
- "Getting Late" on YouTube

Alternative cover
- Alternative cover used in international territories

"Getting Late" is the debut single by South African singer Tyla featuring producer Kooldrink. It was produced by Kooldrink and Rogan Kelly, and released on 25 October 2019. Filmed during the COVID-19 pandemic lockdowns, the music video released in January 2021 accumulated over 2 million views by May 2021 after its dance challenge received attention in South Africa. The song led Tyla to secure a recording contract with Epic Records in June of that year. Musically, the song combines Amapiano and pop music with Kooldrink's EDM beats over Tyla's smooth R&B vocals and elements of jazz and house music. Tyla stated she wanted to incorporate pop music into Amapiano to make it suit her more as she felt the genre had been "male dominated".

== Background, release, and composition ==
"Getting Late" was originally released on 25 October 2019 independently by Tyla. After filming took place before and during the COVID-19 pandemic, Tyla released the music video on 28 January 2021. It achieved virality in her home country of South Africa and the US, accumulating 40,000 views within 15 hours. Months later, Tyla signed a recording contract with American record label Epic Records. The song has elements of jazz and house music with a mixture of pop and amapiano, which would later become Tyla's signature sound that she would dub herself as "pop-iano". Tyla had said in an interview with Phoenix Magazine in 2021:

"Eventually, I’d like to release a small EP, hopefully by the end of the year, and then maybe an album next year. I want to take my time and I wanna put a lot of effort and attention into each detail."

She did end up releasing both an EP and album under Fax/Epic Records in 2024, entitled Tyla to critical and commercial success.

== Music video ==
The music video directed by Tyla's then manager premiered on 28 January 2021, and centers around Tyla and her troupe of female dancers bringing to life 2000s R&B music video visuals in Johannesburg's landscape. All paired with marching bands and cheerleaders, laser lights, lingerie and mansions.

== Reception ==
The song received positive reviews upon release. Many complimented Tyla's sultry R&B vocals over the amapiano track and Kooldrink's EDM production.

"Getting Late" emerged as a success after a dance challenge on TikTok, started by Tyla in 2021 received heavy attention with videos racking up over 10.8 million likes on the platform by May 2021. Tyla told Headliner Magazine in 2021:

It just blew up, I never decided to get on TikTok just to promote my music. I enjoy making videos, it's something that I genuinely like doing. And the fact that I was able to broaden my audience through that and create a challenge that a lot of people are doing, it just took things to the next level. It helped me connect with my supporters from all over the world. So it definitely did play a huge part in the success.
