= Tyla =

South African singer-songwriter (born 2002)

- Tyla in 2026

Background information
- Born: Tyla Laura Seethal; 30 January 2002 (age 24); Edenvale, East Rand, South Africa
- Genres: Amapiano; pop; R&B
- Occupations: Singer; songwriter
- Instrument: Vocals
- Works: Tyla discography
- Years active: 2019–present
- Labels: FAX; Epic
- Awards: Full list
- Website: tylaworld.com
- Relatives: Sydney Seethal (sister)

Tyla Laura Seethal (/ˈtaɪlə/ TY-luh; born 30 January 2002) known mononymously as Tyla, is a South African singer-songwriter. Dubbed the "Queen of Popiano", her musical style is characterised by a fusion of pop and amapiano.

Born and raised in Johannesburg, Tyla signed with Epic Records in 2021 following the domestic success of her 2019 debut single, "Getting Late". Her 2023 single "Water" served as her international breakthrough; it was the first song by a South African soloist to enter the US Billboard Hot 100 in 55 years, and was awarded the inaugural Grammy Award for Best African Music Performance. The single preceded her self-titled debut album (2024), which was released to critical acclaim and moderate commercial success. In 2025, she released the extended play (EP) WWP, and embarked on its accompanying tour. This was followed by her second studio album, A*Pop (2026), which received critical praise and spawned the Billboard Global 200 top-twenty single "Chanel".

Tyla is the youngest African artist in history to win a Grammy Award, with two wins. Her other accolades include two MTV Video Music Awards, two BET Awards, three MTV Europe Music Awards, among nominations for a BRIT Award, an Ivor Novello Award, a Soul Train Music Award and nine South African Music Awards.

== Early life and education ==
Tyla Laura Seethal was born on 30 January 2002 in Edenvale in Gauteng's East Rand, to parents Sharleen and Sherwin Seethal. She is Coloured, with Zulu, Indian/Indo-Mauritian, and Irish ancestry. She grew up in Johannesburg, and graduated from Edenglen High School in 2019, where she served as Head of Culture. Tyla is the third of five children. Her siblings include two elder half sisters, Alaina and Whitney, a younger brother, Tyrese, and a younger sister, Sydney. Her youngest sibling and sister, Sydney, is a model and content creator, and has appeared alongside Tyla in Swedish clothing brand H&M's Spring 2025 campaign.

During her final year of high school, Tyla began pursuing a music career, sharing original songs and covers on Instagram while actively seeking opportunities in the music industry. She was discovered by her first manager, Garth von Glehn, who arranged her initial recording sessions. She spent every weekend of her final high school year in the recording studio.

== Career ==
=== 2019–2022: Career beginnings ===
In late 2019 after finishing high school, Tyla self-released her debut single, "Getting Late" featuring production from Kooldrink, which achieved national success. Filmed by her own manager intermittently throughout the COVID-19 pandemic lockdowns, the accompanying music video was released in January 2021. It amassed several million views on YouTube, and was nominated for South African Music Award for Best Music Video of the Year in 2022.

As of 2021, she started studying towards a degree in mining engineering, and after much persuasion and "a lot of crying", her parents agreed to let Tyla take a year off university to attempt to lift her music career off the ground. She then signed a recording contract with Epic Records through a joint venture with Fax Records in the United States in May 2021. She followed up her debut single with the singles "Overdue" in October 2021, and "To Last" in November 2022.

=== 2023–2024: International breakthrough with "Water" and Tyla ===
Tyla's first public performance occurred in 2023 during the Dolce & Gabbana afterparty at Milan Fashion Week, following the release of her single "Been Thinking", which earned Tyla her first chart placements of her career, on the Billboard Mainstream R&B/Hip-Hop Airplay and Rhythmic Airplay charts. Heven Haile of Pitchfork described it as a "slick club anthem that channels the seductive pop-R&B hits of mid-2000s Ciara and Rihanna". Tyla then joined Chris Brown as the opening act for his Under the Influence Tour. In May 2023, she released the single "Girl Next Door", featuring Nigerian singer Ayra Starr.

Tyla released the song "Water" in July 2023 as the lead single from her self-titled debut studio album. After spawning a viral dance challenge on the social media platform TikTok, "Water" peaked within the top 10 in multiple countries including South Africa, the United States, and the United Kingdom. Tyla became the first South African soloist in 55 years and the youngest ever to enter the US Billboard Hot 100 with "Water", following Hugh Masekela's "Grazing in the Grass" in 1968. She performed "Water" live on The Bianca Show in Sweden and The Tonight Show Starring Jimmy Fallon in the United States. The music video for "Water" was released on 6 October 2023, it accumulated 3 million views on YouTube in three days. Tyla was then featured on a remix version of "Girls Need Love" by Summer Walker, released as part of the latter's Girls Mix extended play in October 2023.

On the eve of December 2023, she announced the release of her debut studio album, Tyla (2024), and simultaneously released three songs: "Truth or Dare", "On and On", and "Butterflies", as promotional singles from the project on an extended-play of the same name. Tyla performed a medley of "Water" and "Truth or Dare" on the season 24 finale of The Voice on 19 December 2023. At the 66th Annual Grammy Awards in February 2024, Tyla won the inaugural Grammy Award for Best African Music Performance with "Water", also becoming the youngest-ever African artist to win a Grammy Award. Her debut album was officially released via Fax and Epic Records on 22 March 2024. The accompanying music video for "Art" was released in tandem with the album. Tyla received widespread critical acclaim, and reached the top twenty-five on the album charts in the United States, the United Kingdom, the Netherlands, Norway, New Zealand, and Switzerland. Tyla received the most nominations at the 18th Metro FM Music Awards in South Africa, with six nods. She went on to win the most awards at the 2024 BET Awards, tying with Usher and Victoria Monét at the Peacock Theater in Los Angeles, California, where she delivered a live performance of "Jump" for the first time alongside Gunna and Skillibeng.

On 11 October 2024, Tyla released the deluxe edition of her self-titled debut studio album comprising three additional songs including "Push 2 Start". Musically, "Push 2 Start" is a reggae-infused amapiano pop-R&B track, which was positively received and its music video premiered on YouTube on 8 November 2024. Tyla performed at the Victoria's Secret Fashion Show 2024. On 11 November 2024, she made her debut appearance at the MTV Europe Music Awards (EMAs), performing her singles "Push 2 Start" and "Water". That night, she won three EMAs for 'Best African Act', 'Best Afrobeats Artist' and 'Best R&B Artist'. On 5 and 7 December 2024, Tyla held two concerts in her native South Africa, in Cape Town and Pretoria, respectively, with an additional date added in Pretoria for 18 January 2025. These shows preceded the start of her Tyla Tour in 2025, mainly consisting of festival appearances throughout spring and summer 2025, with additional shows in Europe to be rescheduled after Tyla sustained an injury.

=== 2025–present: WWP and A*POP ===
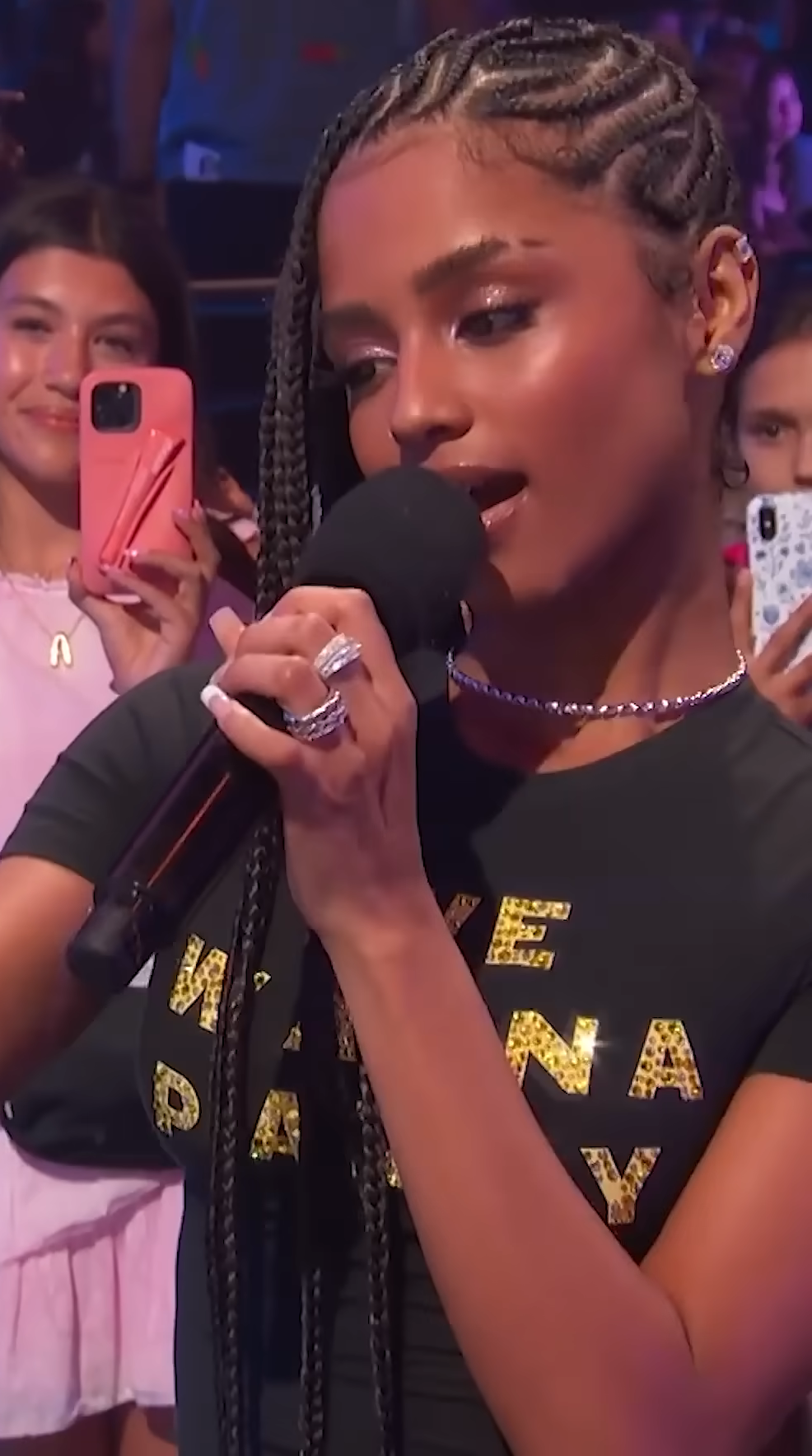
Tyla at the 2025 Kids' Choice Awards

Tyla was featured on the song "When I'm with You" by the Thai rapper Lisa from her album Alter Ego, which was released on 28 February 2025. On 18 April 2025, a remix of the WizTheMc and Bees & Honey song "Show Me Love" featuring Tyla was released. The remix was debuted live at her Coachella 2025 set, where she also performed her upcoming single "Bliss" for the first time. On 9 May 2025, Tyla released the single "Bliss", and hosted the Nickelodeon Kids' Choice Awards the following month. A second single, "Is It", was released on 11 July. She wrote and performed the song "Everything Goes with Blue" for the Smurfs soundtrack, which was released on 18 July.

"Bliss" and "Is It" were included on her second extended-play WWP, an abbreviation for We Wanna Party, which was released on 25 July 2025. Tyla described the EP as "a bridge to the second album", which was set to be released later that year, and explained that it is "going to be such a totally different vibe than what people are expecting". On 7 September 2025, Tyla attended the 2025 MTV Video Music Awards, where she won the Best Afrobeats award for "Push 2 Start" (2024), marking her second win in the category after she previously won the award for "Water" at the previous year's ceremony. While attending the awards, Tyla wore an outfit on the red carpet from the Chanel Spring/Summer '93 collection, and later shared an Instagram post with the caption "PUT ME IN CHANELLLLL", seemingly hinting at the release of a song she had previously teased in July of that year titled "Chanel". Tyla featured on "Talk To Me", with Damiano David and Nile Rodgers, which was released on 11 September 2025. Tyla was featured on the track "Nice Guy" from Cardi B's album Am I the Drama? (2025), which was released on 19 September 2025.

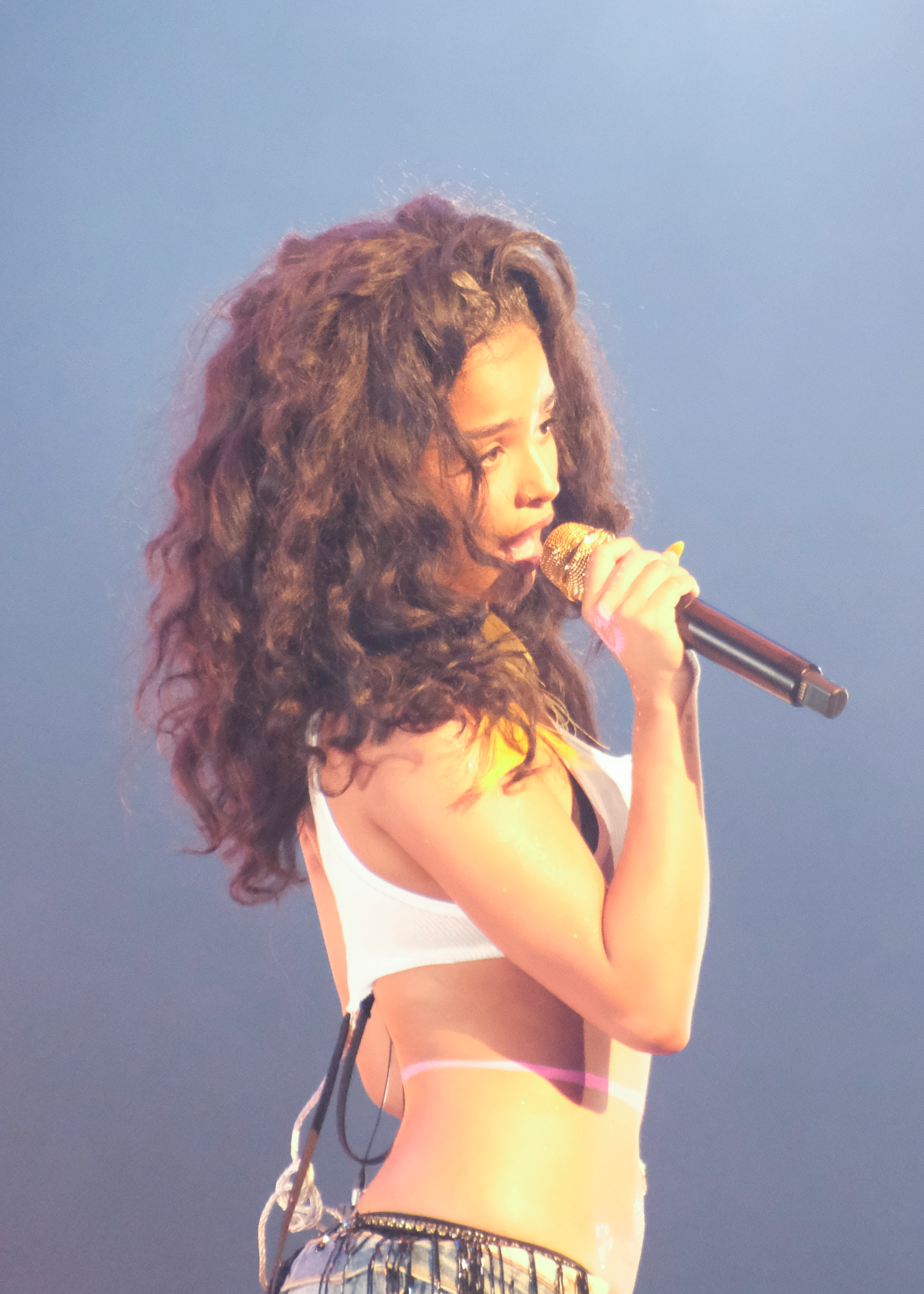
Tyla at 2026 Montreux Jazz Festival

On 24 October, Tyla released the single "Chanel", which became her highest charting entry on the Billboard Global 200 since "Water" (2023), peaking at number 11, while peaking at number 43 on the US Billboard Hot 100. It serves as the lead single for her second studio album, A*Pop (2026). On 11 November 2025, Tyla embarked on her second concert tour, the We Wanna Party Tour (2025), with a sold-out show at Tokyo's Ariake Arena. In December 2025, the South Korean entertainment company HYBE announced a new partnership with Tyla's management company, Africa Creative Agency (ACA). Under the newly created NFO LLC, HYBE and ACA's Brandon Hixon and Colin Gayle will manage Tyla as part of a larger "expansion strategy" to "amplify" continental African artists using Hixon and Gales' creative expertise and HYBE's "scale and resources".

At the 68th Annual Grammy Awards, Tyla won the Best African Music Performance award for her song "Push 2 Start". She became the first artist to win the category twice, having previously won in 2024 for "Water". She won ahead of nominees including Ayra Starr, Burna Boy, Davido, and Eddy Kenzo. At the ceremony, Tyla announced her upcoming second studio album, A*Pop. On 17 April 2026, the second single from A*Pop titled "She Did It Again", featuring Swedish singer-songwriter Zara Larsson, was released. It peaked at number 59 on the US Billboard Hot 100, and number two in Sweden. Tyla later collaborated with Larsson on a remix of the track "Hot & Sexy" from the latter artist's remix album, Midnight Sun: Girls Trip (2026), which was released on 1 May. On 12 June, Tyla performed "Game Time" alongside Future at the opening ceremony of the 2026 FIFA World Cup in the United States, and the South African national anthem before the opening match between South Africa and Mexico. On 8 July, she performed at the Montreux Jazz Festival. The release of A*Pop followed on 24 July, featuring collaborations from Babalwa M, MaWhoo, Liquideep, and Larsson, and was met with positive reception from music critics. On 25 July, Tyla performed a setlist of songs including "Chanel" at the WNBA All-Star Game halftime show.

== Artistry ==
=== Influences ===
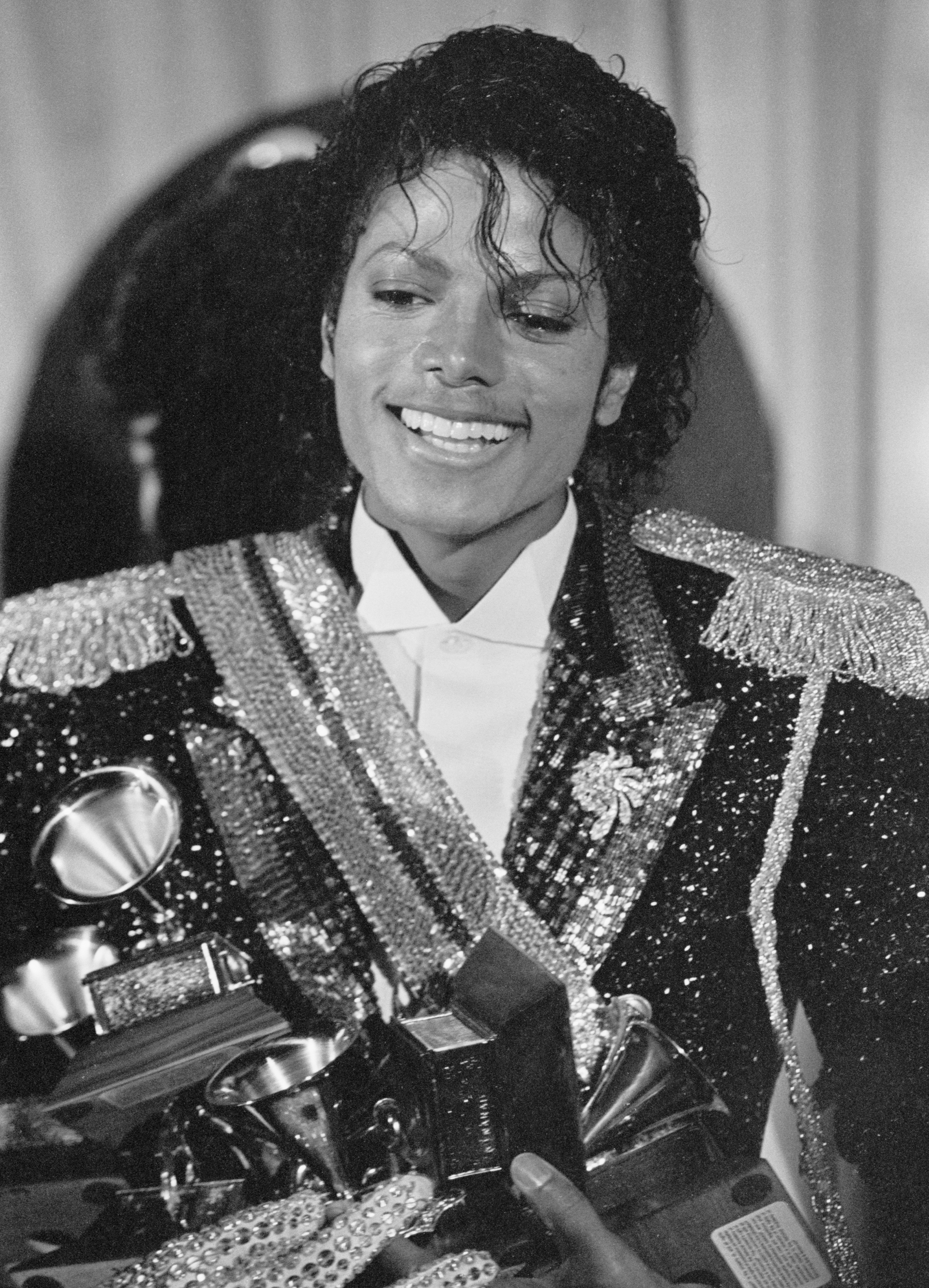
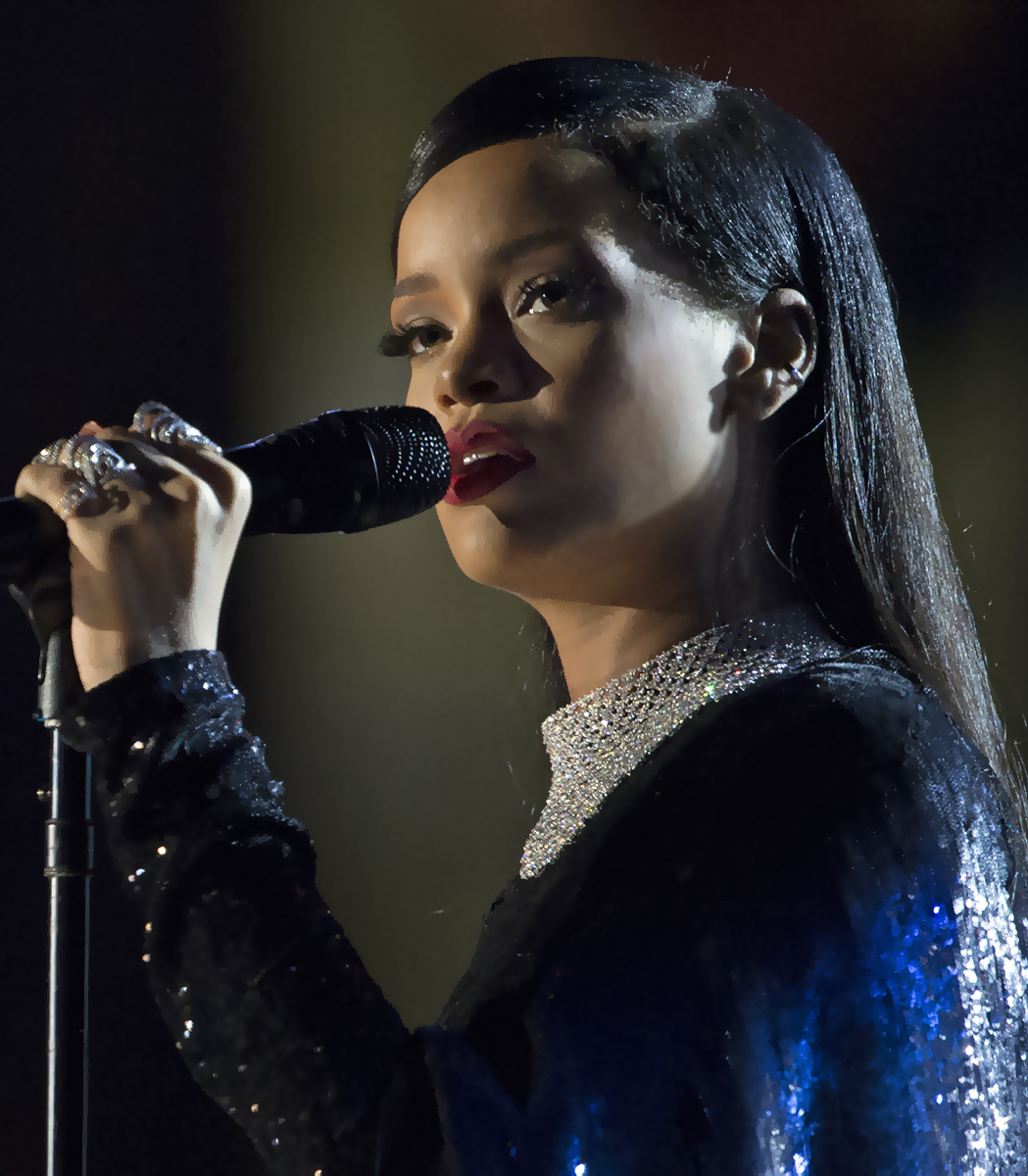
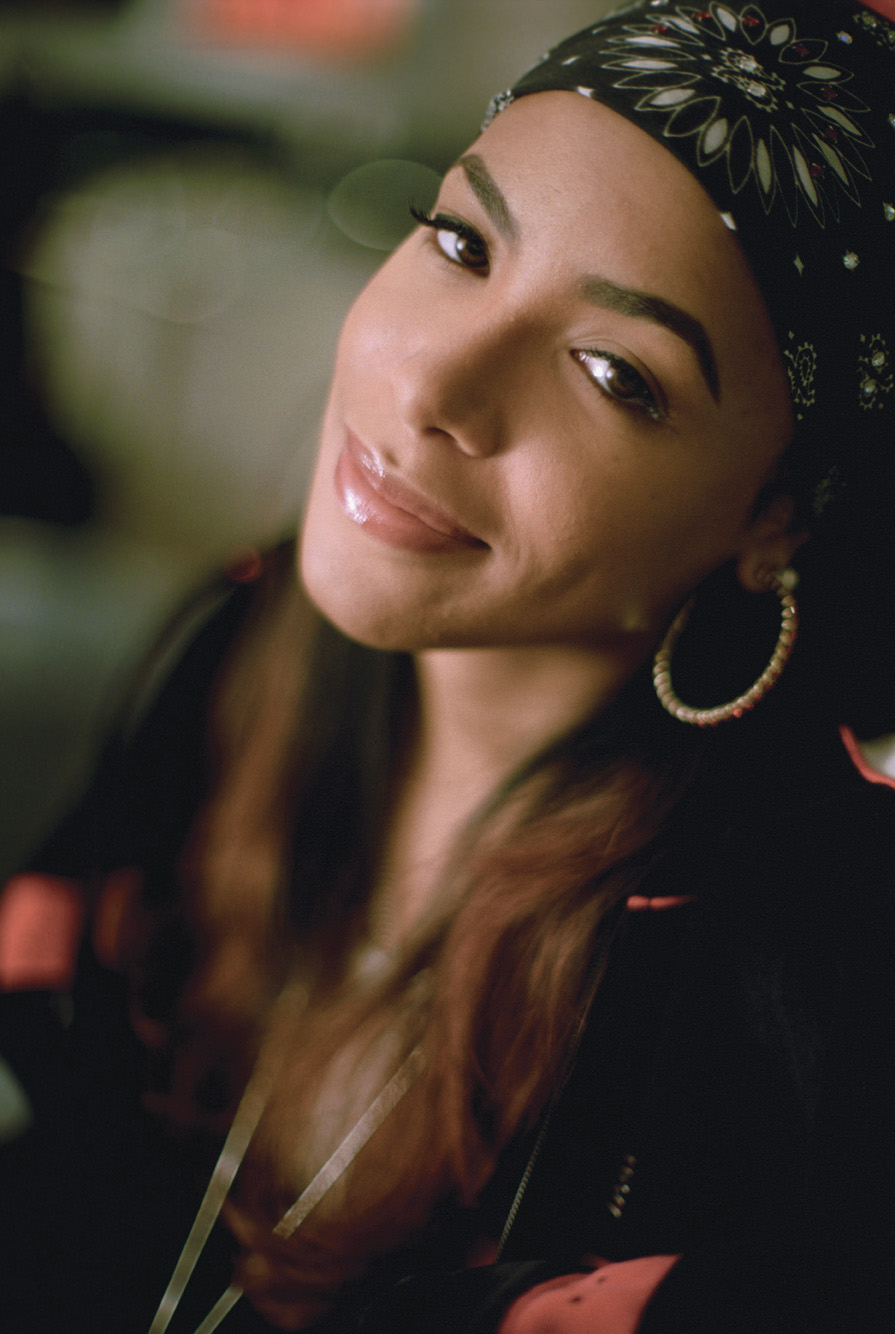
Tyla credits artists such as (left to right) Michael Jackson, Rihanna, and Aaliyah as major musical influences.

Tyla's biggest musical influences are Michael Jackson, Rihanna, Aaliyah, and Britney Spears. Rihanna in particular has been a blueprint for Tyla, both for her sound and for representing her country on the global stage. Other artists who have inspired her include Beyoncé, Whitney Houston, Janet Jackson, Shakira, Cassie, Drake, and other African artists such as Wizkid, Tems, and Freshlyground.

"When I was a kid, I always hoped that a pop star like Rihanna, Britney Spears or Michael Jackson would come out of South Africa. I wanted a star to come from my hometown. Now, for the people of my hometown, I want to be a pop star who represents South Africa"

— Tyla talking to Rolling Stone on 19 January 2024.

=== Musical style ===
Tyla’s music is centered around "popiano", a term to describe her fusion of pop and amapiano genres, with elements of R&B and Afrobeats. She adapts amapiano’s signature log drums and rhythms into concise, three minute pop and R&B song structures, creating a sound that blends Western pop polish with African musical traditions. Her lyrics often explore themes of love, identity and empowerment. For her sound, she has been dubbed the "Queen of Popiano".

== Discography ==
- Tyla (2024)
- A*Pop (2026)

== Filmography ==
Year	Title	Role	Ref
2024	A Nonsense Christmas with Sabrina Carpenter (Netflix)	Herself	
2024	2024 Victoria's Secret Fashion Show (Amazon Prime)	Herself	
2025	2025 Kids' Choice Awards (Paramount & Nickelodeon)	Herself	
2026	Toy Story 5	Inflatable Flamingo (voice)	

== Tours ==
Headlining

- We Wanna Party Tour (2025)
- The A*Pop World Tour (2026–2027)

Promotional

- Tyla Tour (2024–2025)

Supporting

- Chris Brown - Under the Influence Tour (2023)

== See also ==
- List of South African Grammy Award winners and nominees
- List of Ivor Novello Award winners and nominees (2010s–2020s)
