= MaWhoo =

South African artist and model

- Born: Thandeka Nontobeko Ngema; 16 December 1994 (age 31); Eshowe, KwaZulu-Natal, South Africa
- Education: University of South Africa (UNISA)

Thandeka Nontobeko Ngema (born 16 December 1994), professionally known as MaWhoo, is a South African singer-songwriter, and model. She got wide recognition after releasing her debut single "Umshado" featuring Heavy-K.

Ngema has also appeared in several music videos, including acting in cameo roles. She has also modeled for brands in and outside of South Africa. She has also worked for Tribe Afrique, House of Supreme, and Convoy Clothing South Africa. She has collaborated with the likes of DJ Maphorisa, Master KG, Tsisto, Kabza De Small and Vigro Deep.

Apart from her home country, Ngema has performed in African countries such as Botswana, Eswatini, Zimbabwe and Mozambique.

== Background ==
=== Early life ===
Thandeka Nontobeko Ngema was born on 16 December 1994 in Eshowe, KwaZulu-Natal, South Africa. She started her music career at a young age. When she was eleven years old, she took her recorded song to a local radio station for air play, but was refused for being too young.

==== Stage names ====
In an interview, she shared that her stage name means "magical" in Japanese language. She reasoned that the name came up with Okmalumkoolcat.

=== Education ===
Ngema has a degree obtained from the University of South Africa (UNISA).

== Career ==
Her single "Bengicela" with GL_Ceekay, Thukuthela featuring Jazzworx was released June 13, 2025.It reached number one on Apple Music all-genres charts, trending song on YouTube, viral song on Shazam and number 5 on Spotify top songs charts respectively.

== Discography ==
=== Studio albums ===
- What a Time to Be Alive (2022)
- The Chosen (2023)
- The Sound of Magic (2024)
- Amazwi Okubonga (2025)

=== Guest appearances ===
Title	Year	Other artist(s)	Album
"Crazy of Me"	2026	Tyla	A*Pop

== Singles ==
=== As lead artist ===
List of singles as lead artist, with selected chart positions and certifications, showing year released and album name
Title	Year	Peak chart positions	Certifications	Album
Title	Year	ZA	Certifications	Album
"Umshado" (featuring Heavy-K)	2019	—		Non-album single
"Ngiyamthanda" (MaWhoo, Master KG featuring Lowsheen)	2021	—		Non-album single
"Inkanyezi" (MaWhoo, Master KG featuring Lowsheen)	2021	—		Non-album single
"Ngithakazele" (MaWhoo, DJ Fanzy featuring Andry K)	2022	—		Non-album single
"Ngithakazele"	2022	—		Non-album single
"10k Ye McDonald's" (MaWhoo featuring Mdoovar, 9umba)	2022	—		Non-album single
"Thokoza" (Sam Deep, MaWhoo)	2022	—	RiSA: 2× Platinum	Ace of Spades
"Umlilo" (DJ Ngwazi, Pouler D’musiq, MaWhoo)	2023	—		
"Nduma Ndumane" (MaWhoo, Kabza De Small, DJ Maphorisa featuring Da Muziqal Chef)	2023	—		Non-album single
"Bayangzonda" (Mac Lopez, MaWhoo)	2023	—		Non-album single
"NgizoWela" (Slade, MaWhoo, Tycoon featuring Marcus MC, Stacy)	2023	—		Non-album single
"Ngifunani" (Femi Large, MaWhoo)	2023	—		Non-album single
"Imizi Yobaba" (Soulfreakah, MaWhoo)	2024	—		Non-album single
"Uthukela" (MaWhoo featuring Harry Cane, Eemoh)	2024	_		Non-album single
"Gucci" (Mthandeni SK featuring MaWhoo)		_		Non-album single
"Ngeke" (Yumbs, Zwayetoven & MaWhoo featuring Mthunzi)		_		Non-album single
"Khuluma" (Oskido, Master KG & MaWhoo featuring Lilyfaith, Lowsheen & Theo Kgosinkwe)		_		Non-album single
"Uzizwa Kanjan' (Jazzworx, Thukuthela, MaWhoo & GL_Ceejay)	2025	5		Non-album single
"Ziphi Nkomo" (Sir Trill, MaWhoo & B33kay SA featuring DJ 2k, Frank Mabeat & Tumisho)		_		Non-album single
"Phakade Lami" (Da Capo, Soul Star & MaWhoo)		_		Non-album single
"Bengicela" (MaWhoo, GL_ Ceejay & Thukuthela featuring Jazzworx)		1		Amazwi Okubonga
"Smomondiya" (Frank Mabeat & MaWhoo featuring B33kay SA)		_		Non-album single
"Sono Sam" (TBO, MaWhoo & Ntsika featuring Ngwato & Ave Songsmith)		_		Non-album single
"MA AFRIKA" (Deep Sen, MaWhoo & M.J featuring Ntando Yamahlubi)		_		Non-album single
"—" denotes a recording that did not chart or was not released in that territory.

=== As featured artist ===
List of singles as featured artist, with selected chart positions and certifications, showing year released and album name
Title	Year	Peak chart positions	Certifications	Album
Title	Year	ZA	Certifications	Album
"Moya Wami" (Oscar Mbo featuring MaWhoo)	2020	—	Gold	For the Groovists
"Bambelela" (Caltonic SA featuring Sje Konka, MaWhoo, Thabz Le Madonga)	2020	—		Non-album single
"Uqobo Lwami" (DJ Fanzy featuring MaWhoo)	2021	—		Non-album single
"Indoda Nge Card" (DJ Moscow, Deepsen, Eddie The Vocalist feat. DJ Moscow, MaWhoo)	2022	—		Non-album single
"Khumbul' Ekhaya" (Knowley-D featuring Busta 929, MaWhoo)	2022	—		Non-album single
"Dali Wam" (Pabi Cooper, Yumbs featuring MaWhoo, Nkosazana Daughter)	2023	—		Non-album single
"Isthutha" (Inkinga Abangan Bam)" (Sam Deep, De Mthuda featuring Mawhoo, Mkeyz)	2023	—		Non-album single
"Ungiphethe Kahle" (Kabza De Small, DJ Maphorisa featuring Nokwazi, MaWhoo, Mashudu & LeeArt)	2023	—		Non-album single
"Noma Kanjani" (Sino Msolo featuring Kabza De Small, MaWhoo, Azana)	2023	—		Non-album single
"Uthando" (The Groovist featuring MaWhoo)	2023	—		Non-album single
"Zibonakalise" (HKs featuring MaWhoo)	2023	—		Non-album single
"Wena My Dali" (Focalistic featuring Ch'cco, MaWhoo, EeQue, Thama Tee)	2023	—		Non-album single
"Impilo" (Marlode & Owams featuring 2woBunnies, MaWhoo, Leandra.Vert, Toby Franco, Gilano, Sponge 101)	2023	—		Non-album single
"Kutsa" (DJ Sliqe featuring Yanga Chief, MaWhoo, 2woshort, Makwa)	2023	—		Non-album single
"Ungithandile" (Baby Momo featuring MaWhoo, Ceenday, Jay Sax, Shino Kikai, DJ 2K)	2024	—		Non-album single
"Ngifa Nawe" (MFR Souls, Kabza De Small featuring MaWhoo, Bassie, T-Man SA, Shane907)	2024	—		Non-album single
"Amabhoza" (Aymos, Mas Musiq featuring MaWhoo)	2024	—		Impilo
"Ematshwaleni" (Kususa, Anatti featuring MaWhoo, Noxolo Ngema, King Deetoy)	2024	—		Non-album single
"Injabulo" (Lily Faith featuring Theo Kgosinkwe, X-Wise, Oskido, MaWhoo)	2024	—		Non-album single
"Gucci" (Mthandeni SK, featuring MaWhoo)	2024	1		Non-album single
"—" denotes a recording that did not chart or was not released in that territory.

== Other charted and certified songs ==
List of other charted songs, with selected chart positions and certifications, showing year released and album name
Title	Year	Peak chart positions	Certifications	Album
Title	Year	ZA	Certifications	Album
"Kulula" (Mawhoo, DJ Maphorisa, Kabza De Small)	2022	—	Gold	What a Time to Be Alive
"—" denotes a recording that did not chart or was not released in that territory.

== Personal life ==
There were reports that Ngema is dating Hlubi Nkosi. The couple had been reported exchanging gifts.

== Achievements ==
=== Basadi in Music Awards ===
Year	Nominee / work	Award	Result	Ref.
2026	Herself	Artist of the Year	Nominated	
2026	Herself	Amapiano Artist of the Year	Won	
2026	"Bengicela"	Best Female Feature of the Year	Nominated	
2026	Herself	Highest Airplay	Won	
2026	"Sesamukela"	Collaboration of the Year	Nominated	

=== Feather Awards ===
Year	Nominee / work	Award	Result	Ref.
2025	Herself	Musician of the Year	Pending	
2025	Herself	Best Styled Individual	Pending	
