= ROMderful =

British producer, DJ and multi-instrumentalist

- Born: Rommel Alexander Donald; Birmingham, UK
- Genres: Hip hop; R&B
- Occupations: Producer; DJ; multi-instrumentalist
- Instruments: Guitar; bass guitar; violin; drums; vocals
- Years active: 2015–present
- Labels: Same Plate Entertainment; Sony; Soulection

Rommel Alexander Donald, known by his stage name ROMderful (formerly ROM) is a British producer, DJ, and multi-instrumentalist from Birmingham. He released his debut studio album, Press L to Continue, on Same Plate/Sony in April 2019.

== Early life and education ==
Rommel Donald was born and grew up in Birmingham, England. As a child, he learned how to make beats and play multiple instruments, including the guitar, bass guitar, violin, and drums. He was also childhood friends with fellow artist and future collaborator, KayFaraway. He drew inspiration from church music, early 2000s R&B, and video game soundtracks. In his teenage years, he was a member of a death metal band. He would later attend university while also working on his music. During his second semester of university in 2015, however, Donald opted to drop out and focus on music full time.

== Career ==
Donald began producing music under the stage name ROM (or R.O.M.) in 2015. In late 2015, he collaborated with DEFFIE on a remix of Pharrell's "Frontin'". In early 2016, he released the track "I Just Want You To Know" which sampled the Snoop Dogg song, "Beautiful". In March of that year, he released a 3-track EP as part of his record label Soulection's White Label series. That collection contained the song "You Love Em" featuring Emmavie. Later that year, he earned a placement on the remix album for GoldLink's And After That, We Didn't Talk, reworking the track, "Late Night". He also remixed tracks from Raye ("I, U, Us") and Linden Jay ("Lose Again" featuring Shola Ama). In December 2016, ROM released a track called "Kiss and Tell" featuring the vocals of Naji.

In 2017, he adopted his current stage name, ROMderful. He also released several new tracks including "Only One" (with Tendayi) and "SoReal?" (with KayFaraway). Additionally, he produced the Jean Deaux record, "Wikipedia", and appeared on Kitsuné's Afterwork Vol 1 compilation album with the track "BeThere4Me" (featuring KayFaraway). In 2018, ROMderful continued working with Jean Deaux, producing her song "Energy" which was the lead single off her EP, Krash. That year, he was also signed to Same Plate Entertainment, a joint venture label with Sony Music.

In March 2019, he released a collaborative EP, Hours After Midnight, with KayFaraway. The following month, he released his debut studio album, Press L to Continue, on Same Plate/Sony. The album was preceded by the singles "Run Tings" (with Shakka and featuring Dounia) and "1 Missed Call" (featuring Dean and Tabber). The album also featured guest appearances from TOBi, Jay Prince, Devin Tracy, Wade, and KayFaraway. Vocals from ROMderful himself also appeared on the album. Music videos for "Run Tings" and "Tired of the Games" (featuring TOBi) premiered after the album's release. ROMderful also produced the Duckwrth track "KING KING" released in May 2019 and the Jean Deaux track, "Anytime" (featuring Kehlani) released in June 2019.

In 2024, he performed the song, The Water Song, from the children's television in Yo Gabba Gabbaland, in episode 5, Water, in Season 1.

== Discography ==
=== Studio albums ===
List of studio albums with selected details
Title	Details
Press L to Continue	Released: 23 April 2019; Label: Same Plate/Sony; Formats: Digital download
PLEASE RECONNECT CONTROLLER	Released: 29 October 2021; Label: EMA Recordings; Formats: Digital download

=== EPs ===
List of EPs with selected details
Title	Details
Soulection White Label – 018	Released: 18 March 2016; Label: Soulection; Formats: Digital download
Hours After Midnight (with KayFaraway)	Released: 14 March 2019; Label: Self-released; Formats: Digital download
ICE CREAM CLONES	Released: 25 November 2020; Label: Self-released; Formats: Digital download
UTOPIA (with Summer Soul)	Released: 9 June 2022; Label: Self-released; Formats: Digital download
ICE CREAM CLONES 2	Released: 29 September 2023; Label: Self-released; Formats: Digital download

=== Singles ===
List of singles with selected details
Title	Year	Album
"Only One" (feat. Tendayi)	2017	Non-album single
"BeThere4Me" (feat. KayFaraway)	2017	Afterwork Vol 1
"Run Tings" (with Shakka and feat. Dounia)	2019	Press L to Continue
"1 Missed Call" (feat. Dean and Tabber)	2019	Press L to Continue

=== Production and remixes ===
List of production and remix credits
Song	Year	Artist	Album	Role
"Frontin'" (remix with DEFFIE)	2015	Pharrell (feat. Jay-Z)	In My Mind	Remixer
"Late Night" (remix)	2016	GoldLink (feat. Masego)	And After That, We Didn't Talk	Remixer
"I, U, Us" (remix)	2016	Raye	Second	Remixer
"Lose Again" (remix)	2016	Linden Jay (feat. Shola Ama)	Non-album single	Remixer
"Wikipedia"	2017	Jean Deaux	Non-album single	Producer
"Magic"	2017	Rayana Jay	Morning After	Producer
"Energy"	2018	Jean Deaux	Krash	Producer
"Squeeze"	2018	Lou Phelps (feat. Jahkoy)	Non-album single	Producer
"Anytime"	2019	Jean Deaux (feat. Kehlani)	Empathy	Producer
"KING KING"	2019	Duckwrth	THE FALLING MAN	Producer
"Online"	2020	SIRUP	cure	Producer
"Overnight"	2020	SIRUP	cure	Producer
"Sunshine"	2020	SIRUP	cure	Producer
