= At What Cost (disambiguation) =

At What Cost is a 2017 album by American hip hop artist Goldlink.

At What Cost may also refer to:

- At What Cost?, a graduate student group formed at Cornell University, U.S., in August 2002 to oppose a graduate student unionization drive
- At What Cost?, a 2022 Australian play by Nathan Maynard, produced by Belvoir Theatre Company
- At What Cost?, a 2023 single by Lil Mabu
