= Lil2Posh =

American rapper and record producer (born 2003)

- Also known as: Posh, Beezy Spears
- Born: Caleb Saulsberry; 24 September 2003 (age 22); Chicago, Illinois, U.S.
- Genres: Hip hop; trap
- Occupations: Rapper; singer; record producer; songwriter
- Years active: 2024–present

Caleb Saulsberry (born 24 September 2003), professionally known as Lil2Posh (stylized in lowercase), is an American rapper and record producer from Chicago, Illinois. Noted for his sound inspired from Chicago bop of the early 2010s, he started gaining early attention for his breakout mixtape Fiesta Boy in 2025.

== Early life ==
Saulsberry grew up in Chicago and was involved in modeling for local Instagram fashion brands before transitioning to music. According to an interview, his early modeling efforts ended after he got eyebrow and lip piercings, which he said affected casting opportunities.

== Career ==
Saulsberry first gained attention in 2024 after releasing his debut single "Cap Flow", which he recorded while living in Atlanta with a producer roommate. The song quickly accumulated significant online plays after being posted on social media, encouraging him to pursue music more seriously.

In April 2025, Saulsberry released his breakout mixtape, Fiesta Boy. The sound was described with heavy influence from early Chicago bop culture. He would then start opening up shows for Nine Vicious and Thirteendegrees.

== Musical style ==
Saulsberry's musical style draws heavily into the Chicago bop sound, citing local influences from Sicko Mobb, Chief Keef, Speaker Knockerz, and including auto-tuned "swag era" music from the early and mid 2010s hip-hop.

== Discography ==
=== Mixtapes ===
Title	Album details
Fiesta Boy	Released: April 4, 2025; Label: Self-released; Format: Digital download, streaming
1017 Posh	Released: January 23, 2026; Label: Self-released; Format: Digital download, streaming
Graduation Tape	Released: June 12, 2026; Label: Self-released; Format: Digital download, streaming

=== Extended plays ===
Title	Album details
Hate Bein Sober	Released: February 11, 2025; Label: Self-released; Format: Digital download, streaming
Far Away ...	Released: February 14, 2025; Label: Self-released; Format: Digital download, streaming
Designer Boy	Released: August 8, 2025; Label: Self-released; Format: Digital download, streaming
Speedin	Released: November 28, 2025; Label: Self-released; Format: Digital download, streaming
Ghetto Girl	Released: February 14, 2026; Label: Self-released; Format: Digital download, streaming
