= Dounia =

American singer-songwriter (born 1997)

Dounia Tazi
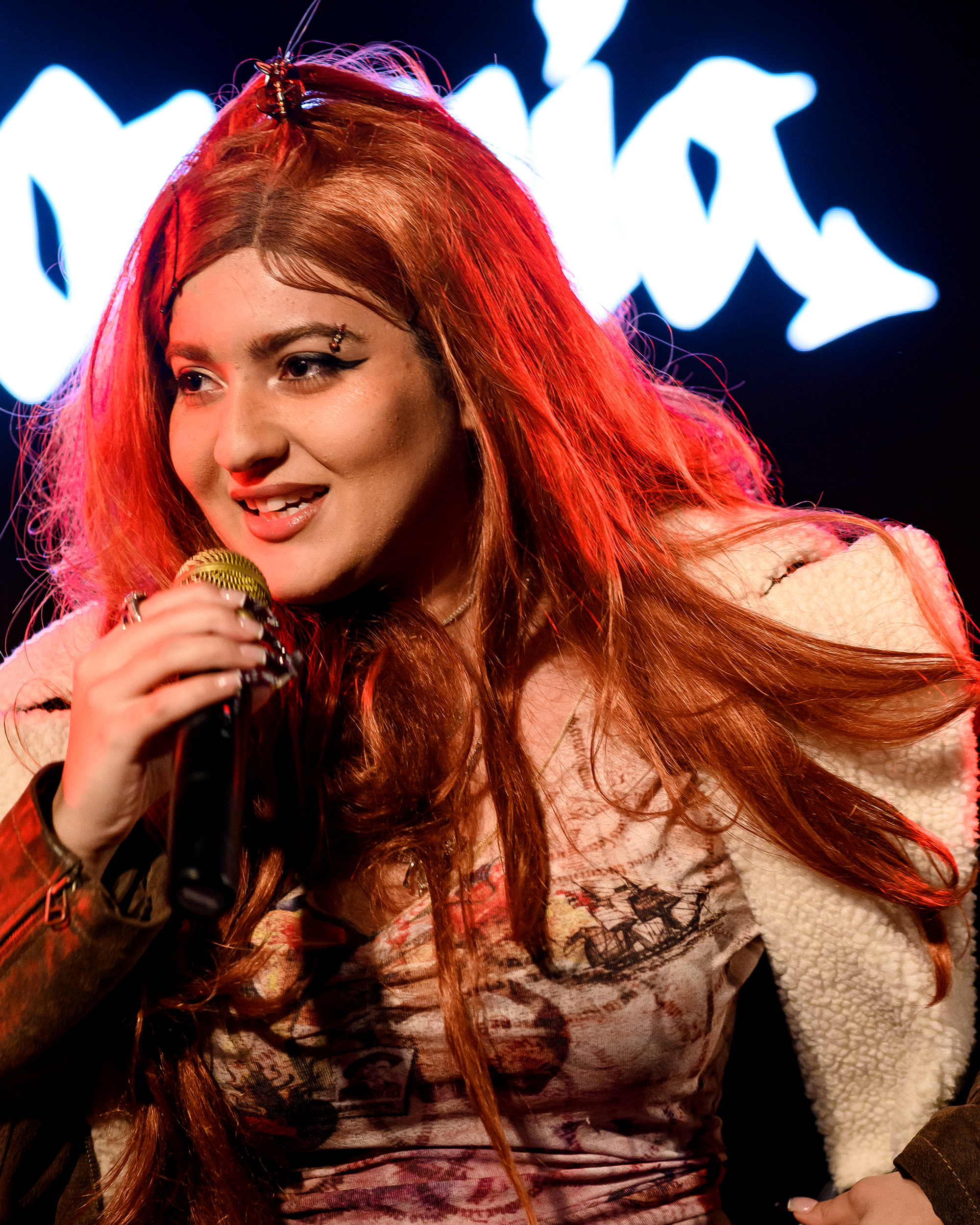
- Dounia in 2019
- Born: Queens, New York, U.S. or Morocco
- Occupations: Singer; songwriter; model
- Musical career
- Genres: Alternative R&B; R&B; hip hop; soul
- Instruments: Vocals, guitar
- Years active: 2013–present
- Labels: Independent (2017–present); Empire Distribution (2017-present)
- Website: www.dounia.world

Dounia Tazi (Arabic: دنيا التازي; born March 31, 1997), known mononymously as Dounia, is a Moroccan-American singer, songwriter and model. She rose to prominence as a model. She began releasing music commercially in 2017. Her first commercial EP, Intro To, was independently released on October 20, 2017. This was followed by her second EP, The Avant-Garden, released on November 30, 2018, through Empire Distribution and her third EP, NOT GOOD FOR THE EGO, released on May 24, 2019. Her debut album, The Scandal, was released July 17, 2019, preceded by the single "Delightful".

== Early life ==
It is unclear as to whether she was born in Queens, New York or Morocco. She was sent to Morocco as a baby while her mother stayed in Queens for work. She returned to Queens at the age of 8 and taught herself English by reading books from the local library. Although Tazi grew up playing guitar, she was not exposed to much music in her youth due to her upbringing in a "strict Muslim household", which inspired her to seek out music that she enjoyed during her time in high school. This exploration of music led her to begin writing and recording music of her own, resulting in the release of a diss track about a boy she dated, which she posted to SoundCloud. Tazi began thrifting in high school and started a body-positive Instagram account to model her outfits. After flunking out of high school, she worked for a short time at an American Apparel store.

== Career ==
Tazi began modeling when she received an offer to be part of a Forever 21 campaign. She gained wider notice after modeling for other brands, such as Sephora and Refinery29, and built an Instagram following of over 200,000 for her unique focus on body-positivity. She subsequently used her modeling gigs to fund a career in music, taking advantage of her online connections to find a manager and begin producing music. During her time as a model, she had always planned to transition into music. Tazi's first commercial single, "East Coast Hiding" was released independently in January 2017, followed by "Shyne," which was released in March through an exclusive article on The Fader. Her debut, 8-track EP, Intro To, was released in partnership with Empire Distribution on October 20, 2017. Upon release of the EP, Time highlighted Tazi's "dreamy brand of rap-singing over vibey, rolling beats, it’s a confident alt R&B sound that explores the challenges of overcoming the grind through its honest, Queens-inflected poetry." The EP charted in the top 10 of the iTunes R&B Chart. An official music video for the track "So Cool", directed by Barbie Ferreira in her directorial debut, was released in March 2018. In July 2018, Dounia was a featured singer on two tracks, "WF001" and "Untitled", from Queens rap crew World's Fair's debut album New Lows.

"Avante-Garde", the lead single from Tazi's sophomore EP, was released in June 2018 with an official music video. The second single, "How I See It", was released in August 2018 alongside a self-directed and self-edited music video. In September 2018, Tazi was a featured vocalist on Supa Bwe's track "Entropy", produced by Shepard Sounds. A stand-alone single "Everything's a Joke", featuring production by Breakfast N Vegas, was released on September 28. In late October, Dounia performed as the opening act for French artist Christine and the Queens on several tour dates across North America, including sold-out shows in New York and Los Angeles. On November 15, 2018, Tazi was featured with electro-pop trio SHAED at Billboard's "Industry Nights" talent showcase, where she performed the songs "How I See It", "Avant-Garde", and "East Coast Hiding", among others. A music video for the third single "Rich Girl Mood", directed by Tired Studio Production and guest-starring featured singer Kehlani, was released in advance of the EP on November 28. The Avant-Garden, Tazi's second commercial EP, was released on November 30, 2018, through Empire Distribution.

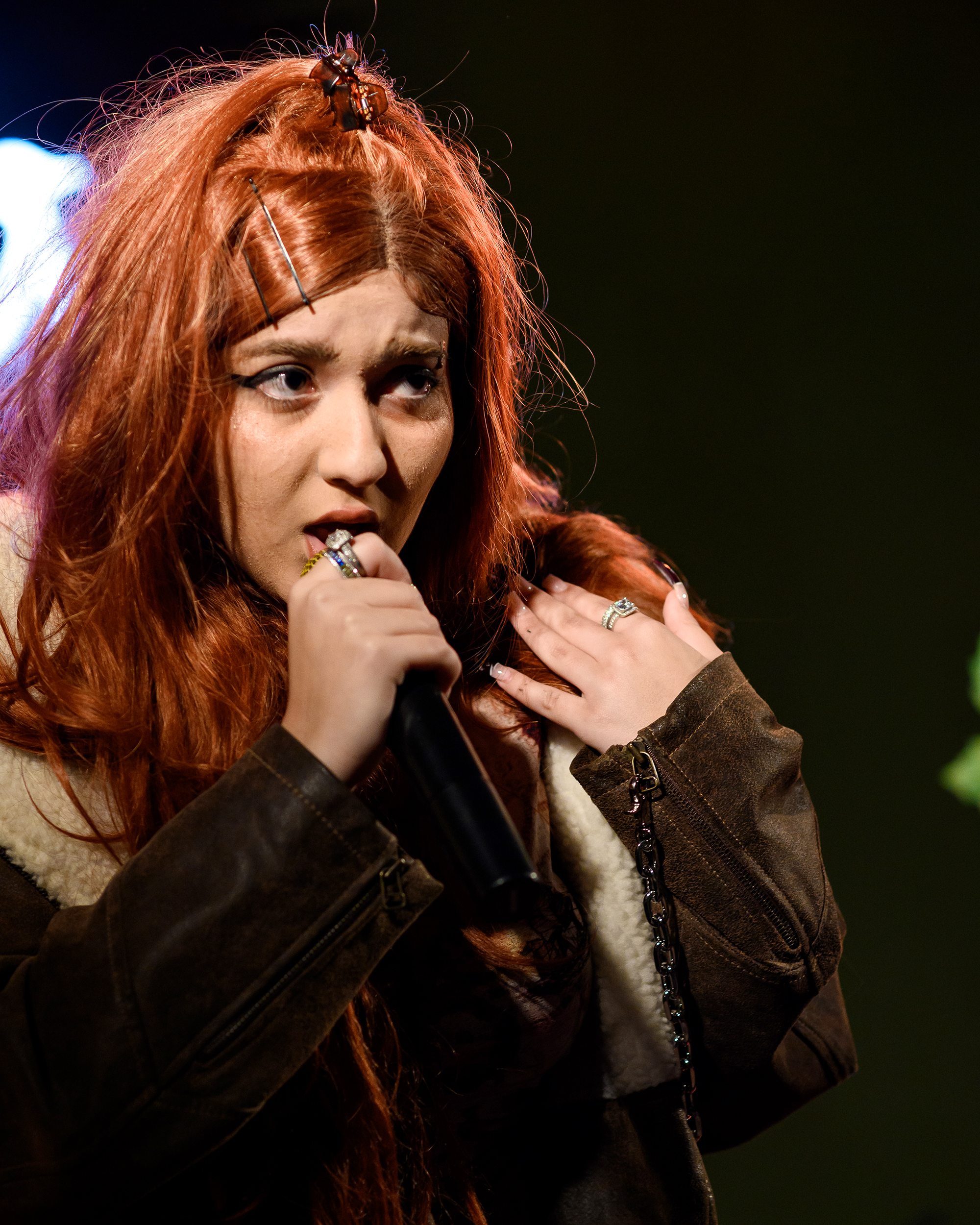
Dounia performing in 2019

In March 2019, Tazi released two singles, "ROYAL" and "LOWKEY GRL". "LOWKEY GRL" features Moroccan Doll, a moniker meant to represent Tazi's alter ego, who raps verses in Darija and represents a "little, unconventional Moroccan Girl". Also in March, she was featured alongside Shakka on "Run Tings", the lead single from English DJ ROMderful's debut album, Press L to Continue. Tazi's third EP, NOT GOOD FOR THE EGO, was released May 21, 2019, and contains 4 tracks, including the lead single "TOXIC", which Prelude Press noted for its fusion of Pop, Soul, and R&B, with "sharp, sassy, and unapologetic lyrical content". In spring of 2019, Dounia was a featured performer at numerous music festivals across the United States, including BUKU Music + Art Project, SunFest, and Soundset Music Festival. Her debut album, The Scandal, was released on July 17, 2019, and features new tracks as well as those featured on Not Good for the Ego. Dounia stated that the album's themes will move away from glamorizing a party lifestyle and move towards promoting spirituality and positive ways of coping. The album was preceded by the single "Delightful", which became available for streaming, and download alongside the album's pre-order. Previous singles "Royal", "Lowkey Grl", and "Toxic" were included on the album, in addition to the track "Up 4 Air" from Not Good for the Ego. In continuation of her festival circuit, Tazi performed at Diplo's Mad City Festival on July 20 and is scheduled to perform at Rolling Loud Bay Area on September 28.

Dounia was a featured performer on Marian Hill's single "Take A Number", released with its music video on August 23, 2019.

== Personal life ==
Dounia is bisexual.

== Discography ==
=== Studio albums ===
List of Studio albums
Title	Details
The Scandal	Released: July 17, 2019; Label: Empire Distribution; Format: Digital download
Dounia	Released: November 1, 2023; Label: Empire Distribution; Format: Digital download

=== EPs ===
List of EPs
Title	Details
Intro To	Released: October 20, 2017; Label: Empire Distribution; Format: Digital download
The Avant-Garden	Released: November 28, 2018; Label: Empire Distribution; Format: Digital download
NOT GOOD FOR THE EGO	Released: May 21, 2019; Label: Empire Distribution; Format: Digital download

=== Singles ===
As lead artist

Title	Year	Album
"East Coast Hiding"	2017	Intro To
"Shyne"	2017	Intro To
"Avant-Garde"	2018	The Avant-Garden
"How I See It"	2018	The Avant-Garden
"Everything's a Joke"	2018	Non-album single
"Rich Girl Mood" (feat. Kehlani)	2018	The Avant-Garden
"ROYAL"	2019	The Scandal
"LOWKEY GRL" (feat. Moroccan Doll)	2019	The Scandal
"TOXIC"	2019	NOT GOOD FOR THE EGO & The Scandal
"Delightful"	2019	The Scandal

As featured artist

Title	Year	Album
"Entropy" Supa Bwe featuring Dounia	2018	Just Say Thank You
"Run Tings" ROMderful featuring Shakka & Dounia	2019	Press L to Continue
"Take A Number" Marian Hill featuring Dounia	2019	TBA

=== Other appearances ===
Title	Year	Other artist(s)	Album
"WF001"	2018	World's Fair, Remy Banks, Jeff Donna & Cody B. Wear	New Lows
"Untitled"	2018	World's Fair & Cody B. Ware	New Lows
