= And After That, We Didn't Talk =

Mixtape by GoldLink
- Released: November 8, 2015
- Recorded: 2014–15
- Genres: Hip-hop; electronic; R&B; jazz fusion; neo-soul
- Length: 33:52
- Label: Soulection
- Producers: Braeden Bailey; Demo-Tapped; Galimatias; GoldLink (exec.); Joppe; Joe Kay (exec.); Louie Lastic; McCallaman; Medasin; Merg; Milo Mills; Tom Misch; Jordan Rakei; Rick Rubin (exec.)

GoldLink chronology
The God Complex (2014)	And After That, We Didn't Talk (2015)	At What Cost (2017)

Singles from And After That, We Didn't Talk
- 1. "Dance On Me" Released: August 21, 2015; 2. "Spectrum" Released: October 8, 2015

And After That, We Didn't Talk is the second mixtape from American rapper GoldLink. It was released in November 2015 on Soulection, following his debut mixtape, The God Complex. The mixtape features guest appearances from Anderson .Paak and Masego. The project's production was handled by Louie Lastic, Merg, Galimatias, McCallaman, Braeden Bailey, Medasin, Milo Mills, Demo-Tapped, Tom Misch, and Jordan Rakei.

And After That, We Didn't Talk spawned two singles: "Dance On Me" and "Spectrum".

== Background ==
Shortly after the release of his debut mixtape, The God Complex, Goldlink signed with LA record label Soulection and began working on his second mixtape. In 2015, Goldlink was selected as part of the 2015 XXL Freshman class, and it was announced that he would be working with producer Rick Rubin. He later released the song "Spectrum" as the debut single for the mixtape. It was later revealed that Rick Rubin would be his mentor and executive producer for the album.

== Composition ==
In an interview on Soulection Radio with DJ, host, and mixtape executive producer Joe Kay, GoldLink said that the mixtape is a concept album based around a breakup he had at the age of 16: he says it was due to neither of them truly knowing how to properly handle a relationship. He also noted that this breakup is what led to the events that took place within The God Complex, calling it his "memoir or moment of clarity". He stated that the writing for some of the songs are inspired by either conversations or ex-relationships. The mixtape features personal reflections on themes such as love, coming of age, obsession, intimacy, regret, police brutality, substance abuse, racism, and parenthood. Just like his previous project, the mixtape incorporates a blended style of hip hop and electronic. With the help of numerous producers among the Soulection roster, he was able to additionally blend jazz fusion and neo soul into his trademark style.

== Critical reception ==
The mixtape received positive reviews from critics and fans alike. Music review aggregate site Metacritic scored the project a 72. Pitchfork's Matthew Strauss gave the mixtape a 7.3, stating that "[Goldlink's] music works when every element blends together, and And After That, We Didn't Talk is most interesting when he shares only the most vital details from a moment. It's then that he can wring his experiences for their emotions and convey feelings with more than just words." SPIN magazine's Sheldon Pearce scored the mixtape 7 out of 10, stating "[t]here are a few strong sonic ties to God Complex, specifically the works of producer Louie Lastic, but this album has greater balance. The full spectrum of sound explored is even richer this time around." Kevin Ritchie from NOW rated the mixtape an 80 and stated "Even with quick, dense and precisely rhythmic flows, his rapping is like verbal dancing. Its joyous and romantic moments make the album feel more like a thematic refinement than a musical one."

== Track listing ==
No.	Title	Producer(s)	Length
1.	"After You Left"	McCallaman, Louie Lastic	2:45
2.	"Zipporah"	Braeden Bailey	2:42
3.	"Dark Skin Women"	Louie Lastic	3:03
4.	"Spectrum"	Louie Lastic	3:11
5.	"Dance on Me"	Milo Mills	3:06
6.	"Late Night" (featuring Masego)	Medasin	2:41
7.	"Unique" (featuring Anderson .Paak)	Louie Lastic	3:40
8.	"Palm Trees"	Galimatias	3:33
9.	"Polarized" (featuring Demo-Tapped)	Demo-Tapped	3:00
10.	"New Black"	Tom Misch	1:59
11.	"See I Miss"	Merg	4:12
Total length:			33:52

Notes

- "See I Miss" features additional vocals from Anderson .Paak

Sample credits

- "Late Night" samples "Kolors" by Monte Booker and Smino
- "Dance on Me" samples "My Place" by Tweet
- "Palm Trees" interpolates "Fantasy" by Alina Baraz & Galimatias
- "Spectrum" features a vocal sample of "She's a Bitch" by Missy Elliott

== Remixed version ==
To celebrate Goldlink's signing to RCA Records, he and Soulection released a remix version of And After That, We Didn't Talk, with production handled by producers not featured on the original album, most of which are among the Soulection roster.

No.	Title	Producer(s)	Length
1.	"After You Left (Sevn Thomas remix)"	Sevn Thomas	2:25
2.	"Zipporah (Gravez remix)"	Gravez	3:54
3.	"Dark Skin Women (Chris McClenney remix)"	Chris McClenney	3:08
4.	"Dark Skin Women (POMO remix)"	POMO	3:46
5.	"Dark Skin Women (Cosmo's Midnight & Swindail remix)"	Cosmo's Midnight, Swindail	2:58
6.	"Spectrum (GEOTHEORY remix)"	GEOTHEORY	3:53
7.	"Dance on Me (Mr. Carmack remix)"	Mr. Carmack	2:32
8.	"Dance on Me (Brasstracks Remix)"	Brasstracks	3:10
9.	"Dance on Me (Su Na Remix)"	Su Na	3:48
10.	"Late Night (Swell Remix)" (featuring Masego)	Swell	4:05
11.	"Late Night (ROM Remix)" (featuring Masego)	ROM	2:33
12.	"Late Night (Falcons Remix)" (featuring Masego)	Falcons	3:28
13.	"Unique (Louis Futon remix)" (featuring Anderson .Paak)	Louis Futon	4:14
14.	"Palm Trees (Motez Remix)"	Motez	4:37
15.	"Polarized (CRNKN Remix)" (featuring Demo Taped)	CRNKN	4:11
16.	"New Black (Shagabond Remix)"	Shagabond	2:21
Total length:			55:03
