= Jarreau Vandal =

Dutch DJ and record producer (born 1991)

- Born: Ellroy Jarreau Uyleman; Amsterdam, Netherlands
- Genres: R&B; hip hop; house; Soul; Funk; Jazz; Gnawa
- Occupations: Dj, record producer, singer, songwriter
- Label: Soulection

Ellroy Jarreau Uyleman (born 1989) better known as Jarreau Vandal, is a Dutch DJ, record producer, singer, and songwriter. Known for his eclectic style that blends R&B, hip-hop, funk, house, and electronic music with global influences, particularly South African and Moroccan rhythms.

== Early life ==
Vandal was born and raised in a musical family in Amsterdam, he was exposed to jazz, soul, and funk from a young age. His grandfather introduced him to music production software, which led him to begin producing music at age 16.

== Career ==
Vandal began his career in Amsterdam's club scene before gaining international recognition. In 2014, his work caught the attention of the Los Angeles-based music collective Soulection, which he later joined. That same year, he released his debut project, The Jarreau Vandal White Label. He was named one of Complex and Jamz Supernova's "One to Watch" in 2016.

Since gaining prominence, Vandal has toured extensively across Europe, North America, and Asia, performing at venues like KOKO and Warehouse Project. He has also created music for commercials for brands such as Tommy Hilfiger and Vodafone. His work has been featured on major platforms including Beats 1, BBC 1Xtra, and Boiler Room.

== Musical style ==
Vandal's music is known for its eclectic and genre-defying nature, blending elements of hip-hop, jazz, soul, funk, R&B, and electronic music. He is also known for incorporating various cultural sounds, such as Moroccan rhythms, into his tracks. His influences include artists like Jamiroquai, A Tribe Called Quest, and the Red Hot Chili Peppers. He is also recognized for his remixes of popular songs by artists like G-Eazy, Diplo, and Janet Jackson.

== Live performances ==
Vandal has performed at major international music festivals, including the Montreux Jazz Festival, Amsterdam Dance Event (ADE), and Eurosonic Noorderslag (ESNS). His live show, often billed as "Jarreau Vandal Live," features him on vocals and electronics, frequently accompanied by a drummer or other live instrumentalists.

He has curated his own event series, "Vandalized," in cities like London and Amsterdam.

== Discography ==
Vandal's notable releases include:

- The Jarreau Vandal White Label (2014)
- Suburb Superhero: The Villain Within (2020)
- Anthology (Mixtape), (2018)
- My Way / Bad Shit (2016)
- "Ganga Riddim" (feat. Mehdi Nassouli), (2025)
