= Grammy Award for Best Melodic Rap Performance =

Music award

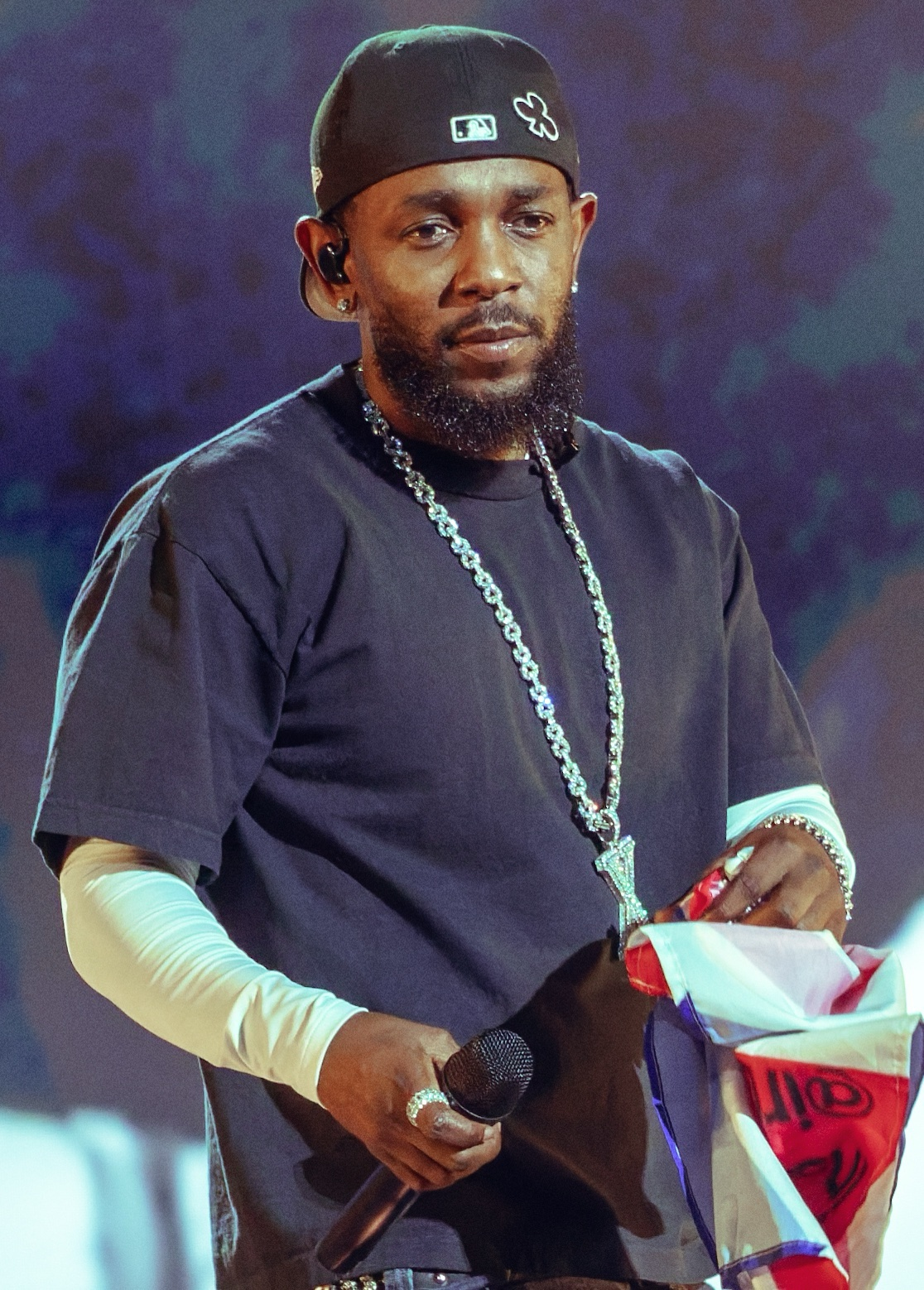
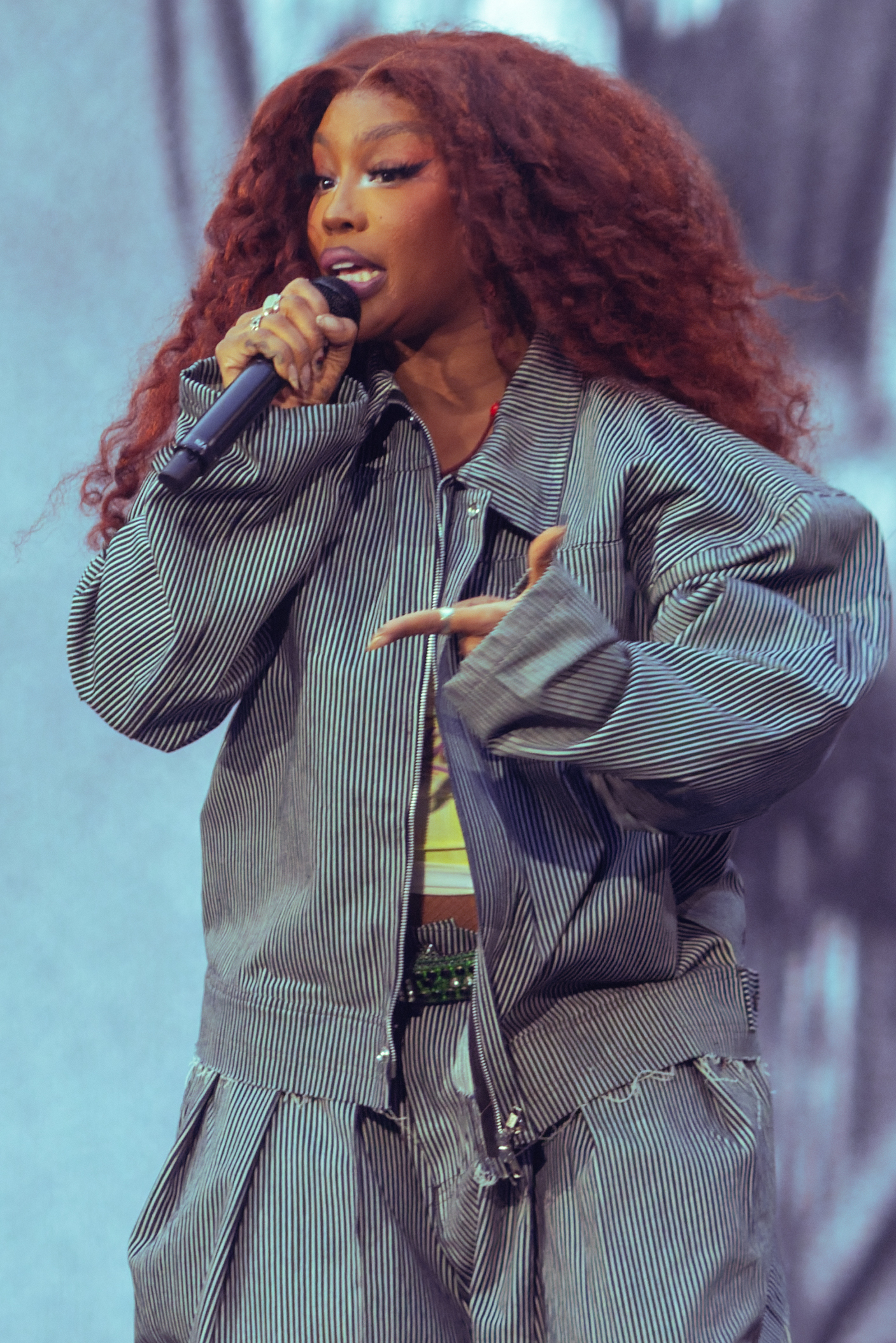
- "Luther" by Kendrick Lamar and SZA is the most recent recipient
- Awarded for: Quality songs featuring both rapped and sung vocals or rap-singing
- Country: United States
- Presented by: National Academy of Recording Arts and Sciences
- First award: 2002
- Currently held by: Kendrick Lamar and SZA, "Luther" (2026)

Highlights
- Most wins: Jay-Z (7 wins)
- Most nominations: Kanye West (15 nominations)
- Website: grammy.com

The Grammy Award for Best Melodic Rap Performance (awarded as Best Rap/Sung Collaboration until 2017, and Best Rap/Sung Performance from 2018 to 2020) is an honor presented at the Grammy Awards, a ceremony that was established in 1958 and originally called the Gramophone Awards, to recording artists for quality songs on which have both rapped and sung or sing-rap vocals. Honors in several categories are presented at the ceremony annually by the National Academy of Recording Arts and Sciences of the United States to "honor artistic achievement, technical proficiency and overall excellence in the recording industry, without regard to album sales or chart position".

The name and definition of the category were changed in June 2020, with immediate effect, to represent the inclusivity of the growing hybrid performance trends within the rap genre. According to the Recording Academy, "This category is intended to recognize solo and collaborative performances containing elements of rap and melody over modern production. This performance requires a strong and clear presence of melody combined with rap cadence, and is inclusive of dialects, lyrics or performance elements from non-rap genres including R&B, rock, country, electronic or more. The production may include traditional elements of rap or elements characteristic of the aforementioned non-rap genres."

The award goes to the artist(s). The producer, engineer and songwriter can apply for a Winners Certificate.

American rapper Eve and American singer Gwen Stefani won the first award in 2002 with "Let Me Blow Ya Mind". The pair were also nominated a second time in 2006 for "Rich Girl". American rapper Jay-Z has received seven Grammys in the category— four times as lead artist and three times as featured artist; he has also been nominated for three other songs. Rihanna is the female artist with the most wins in the category, with five wins out of nine total nominations.

== Recipients ==
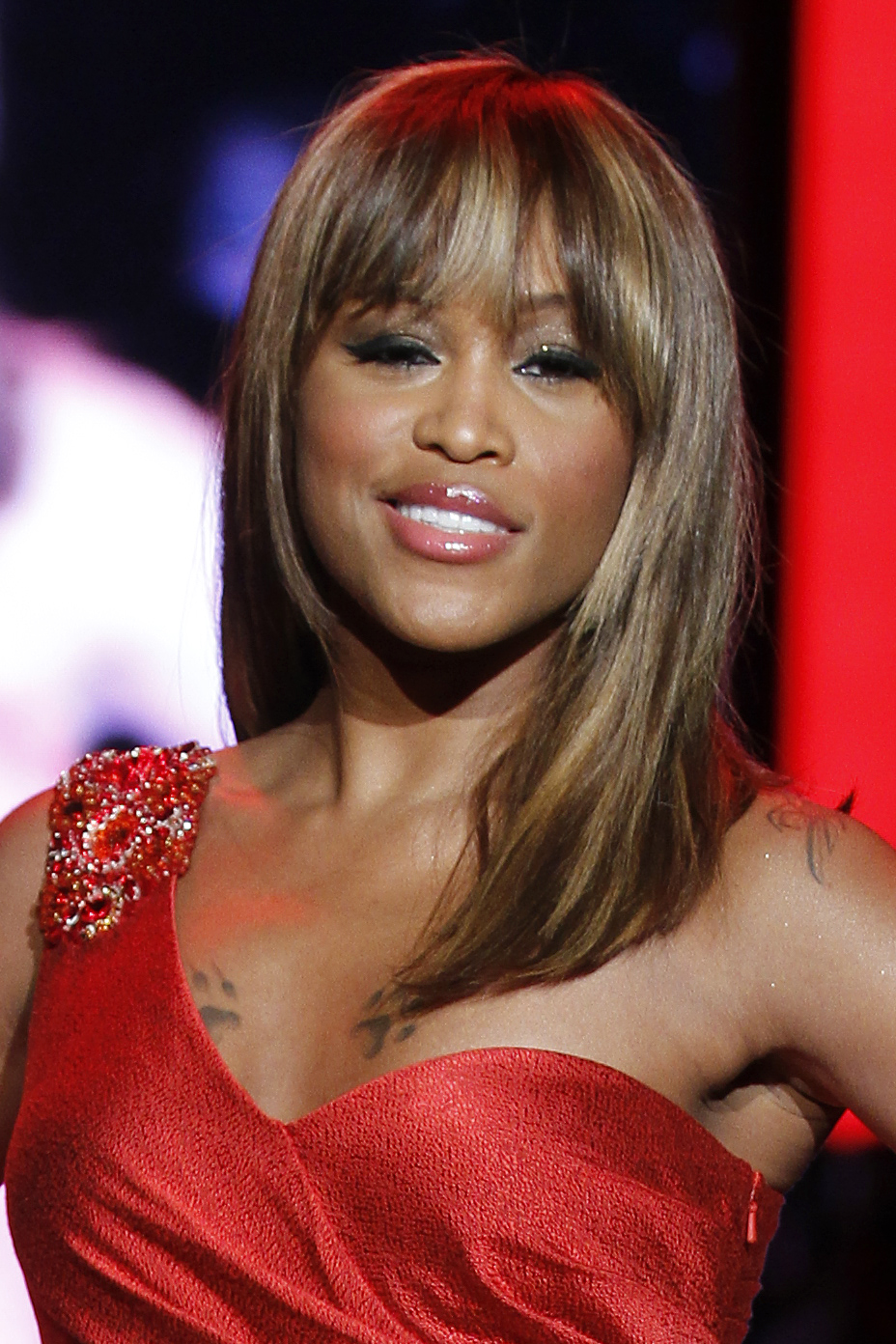
Inaugural winner and two-time nominee Eve

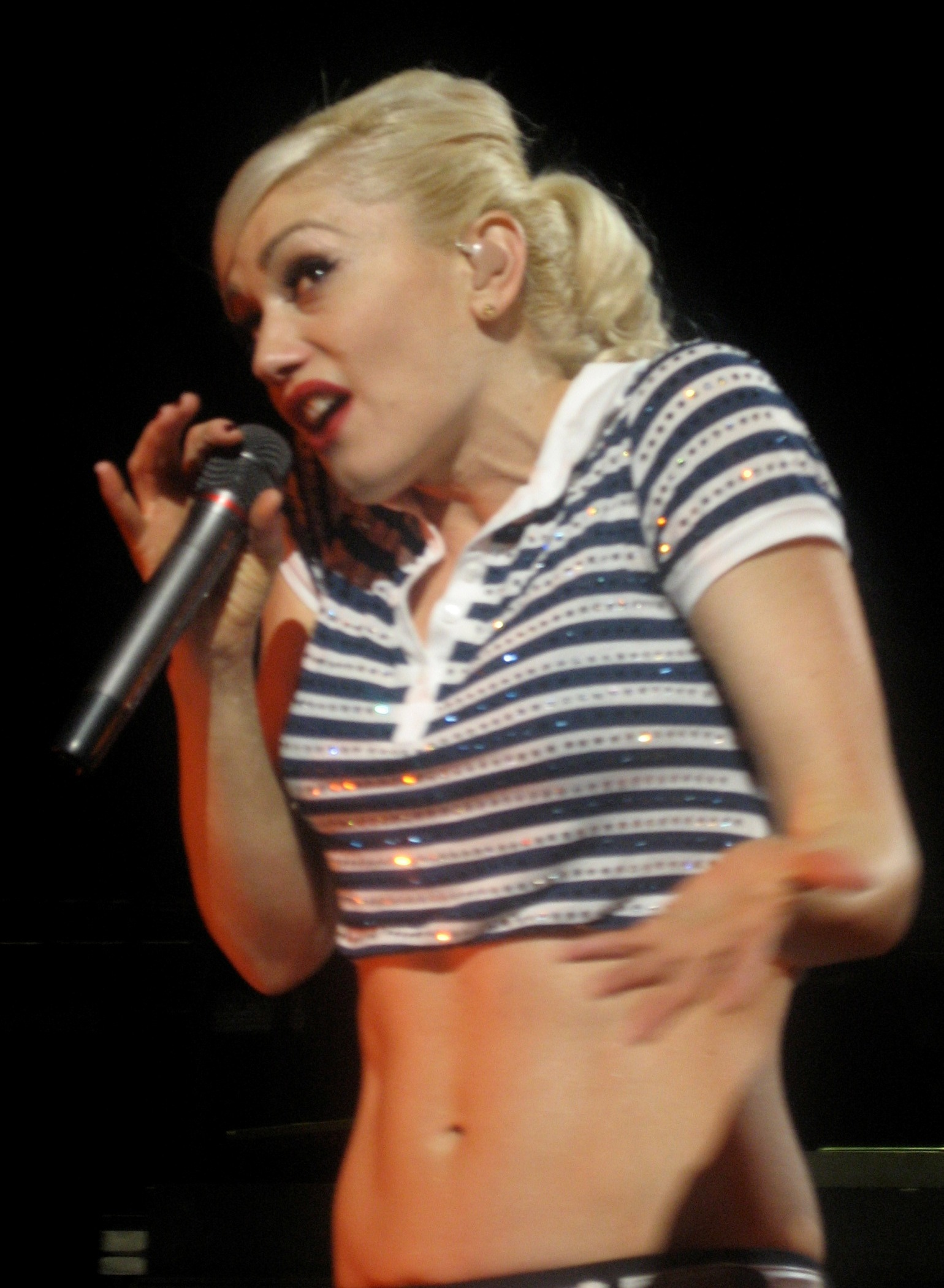
Inaugural winner and two-time nominee Gwen Stefani

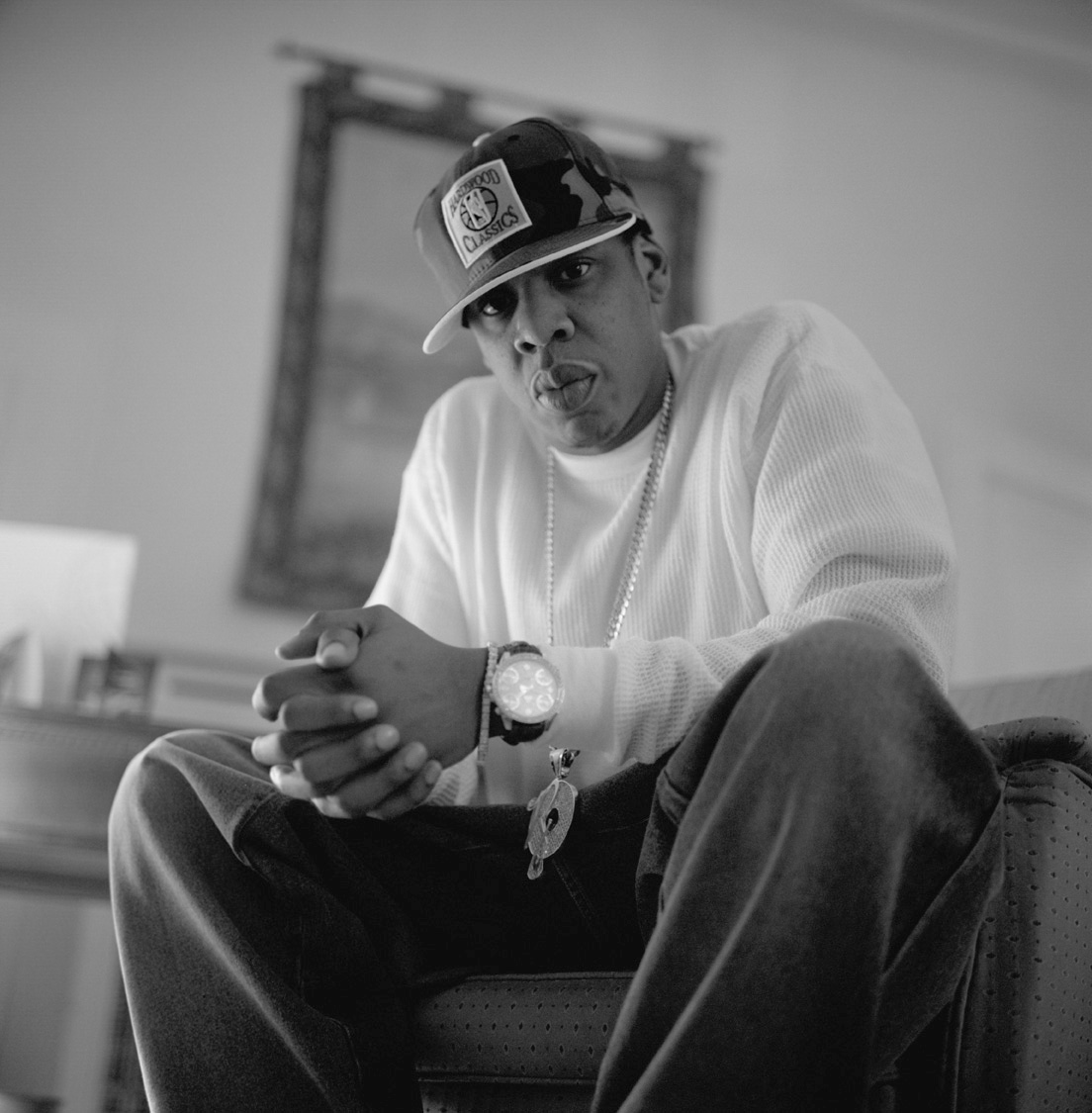
Seven-time winner and eleven-time nominee Jay-Z

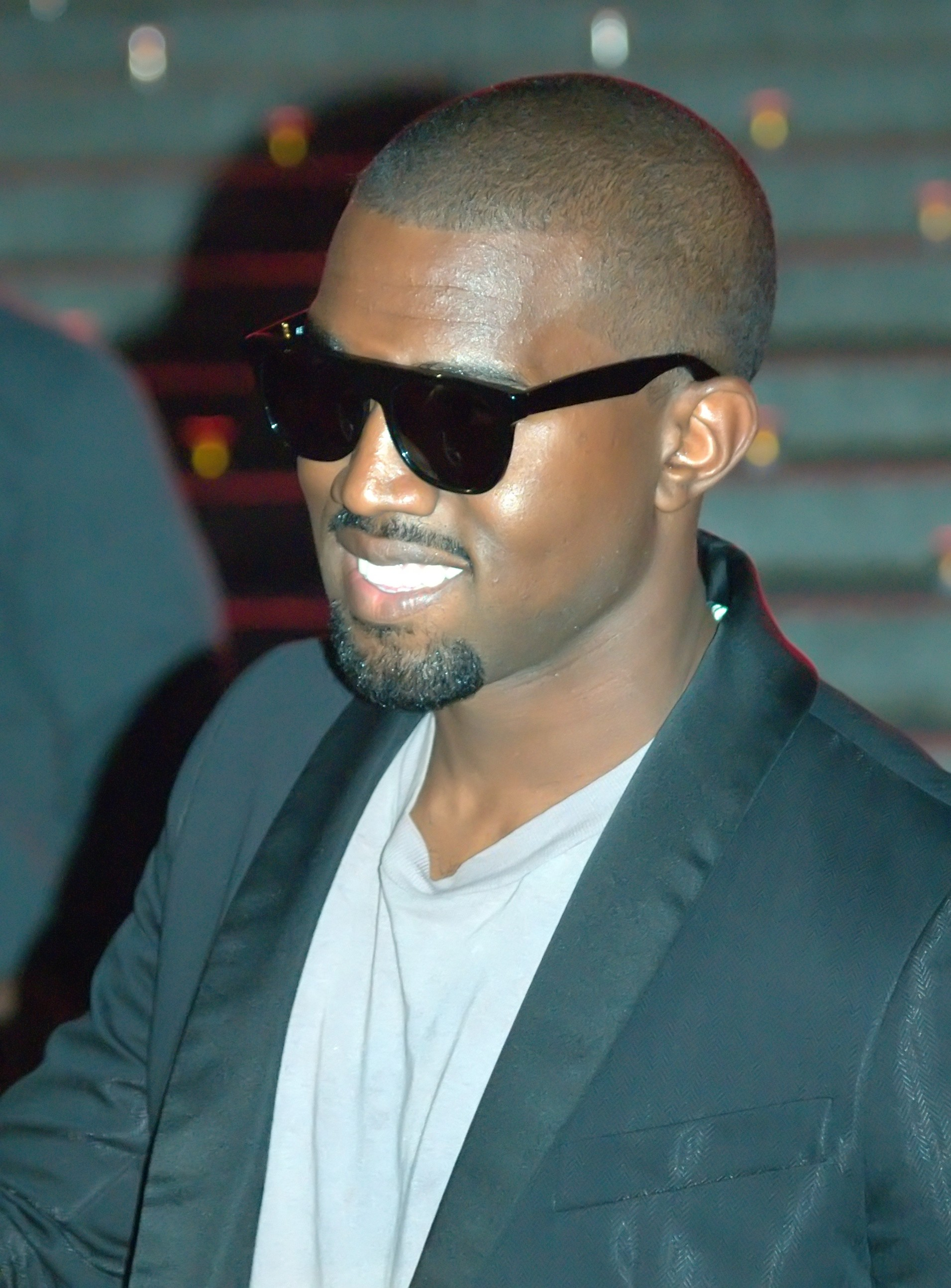
Five-time winner and fifteen-time nominee Kanye West

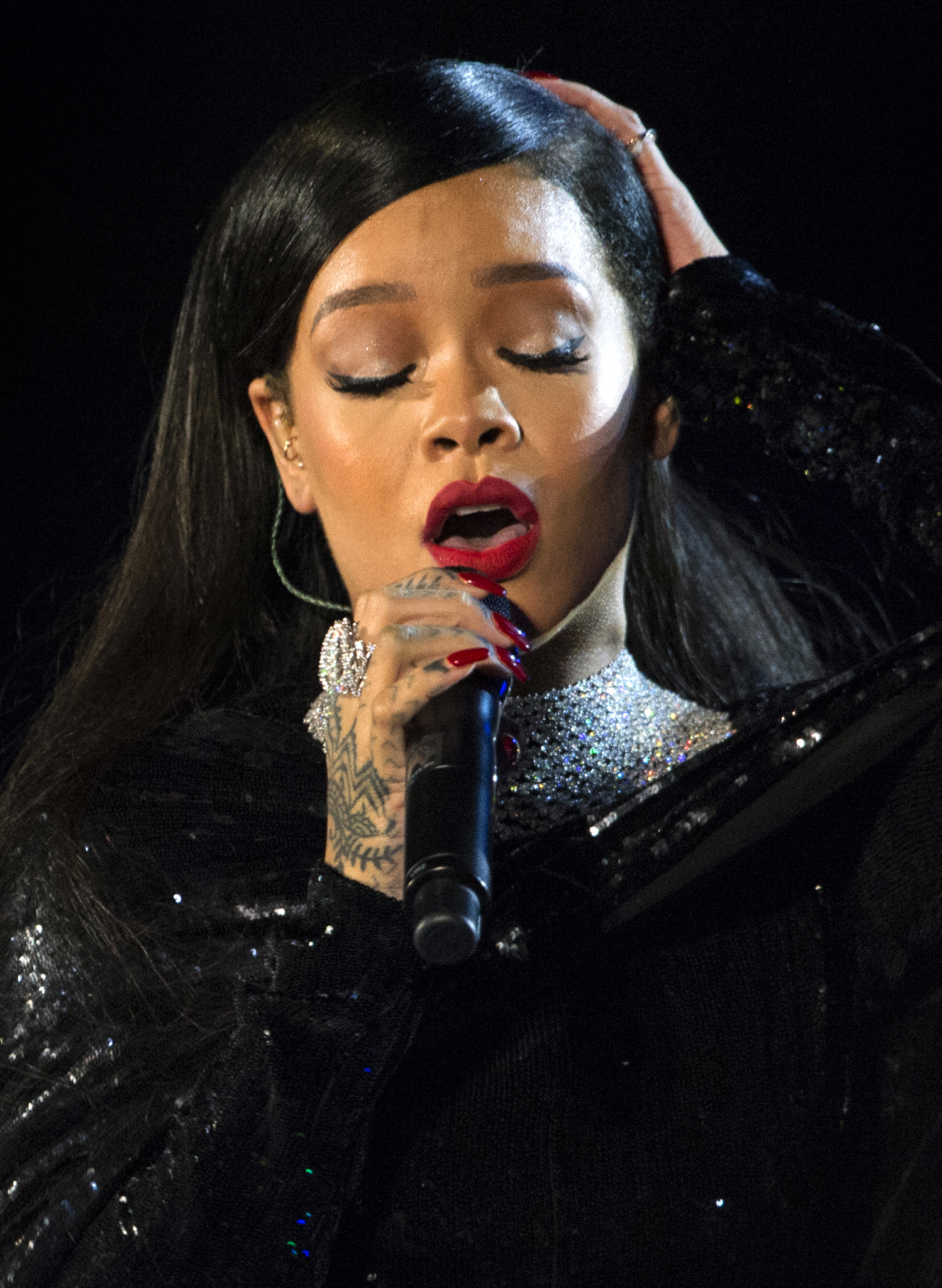
Five-time winner and nine-time nominee Rihanna

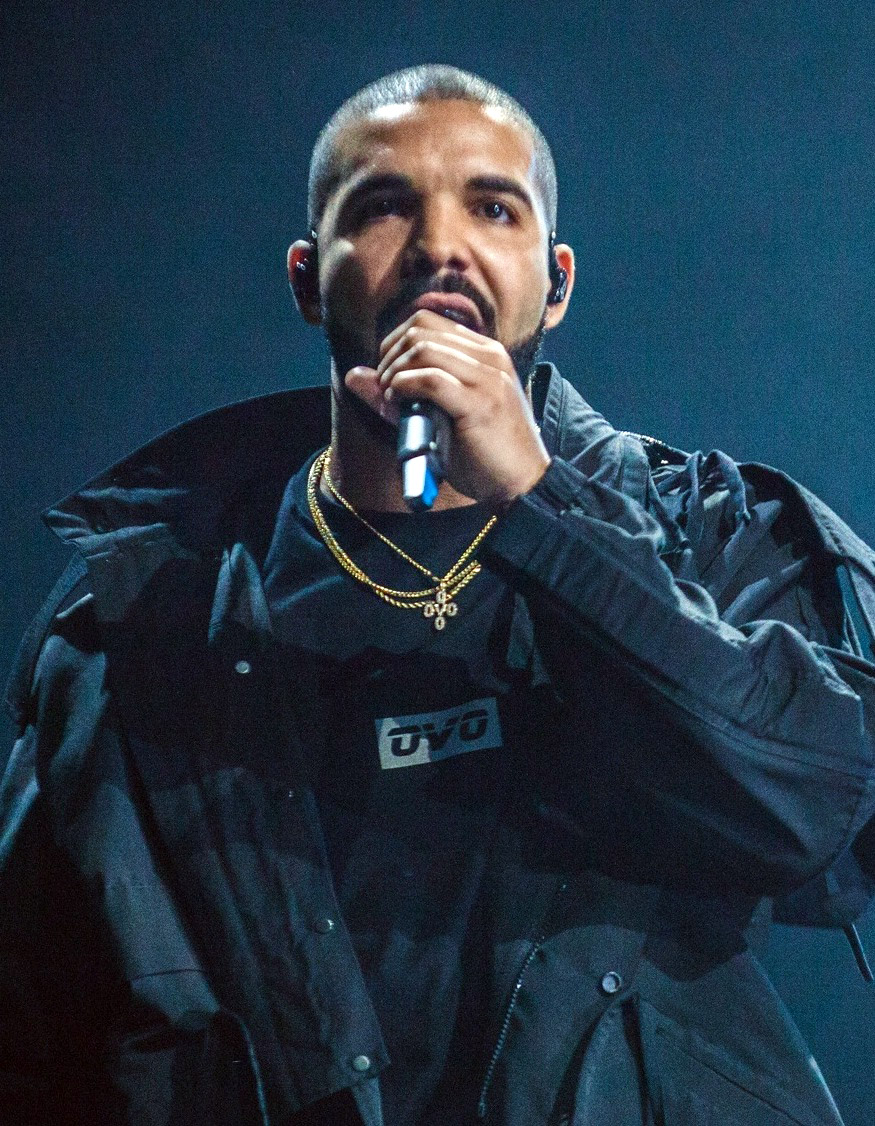
2017 winner, Drake

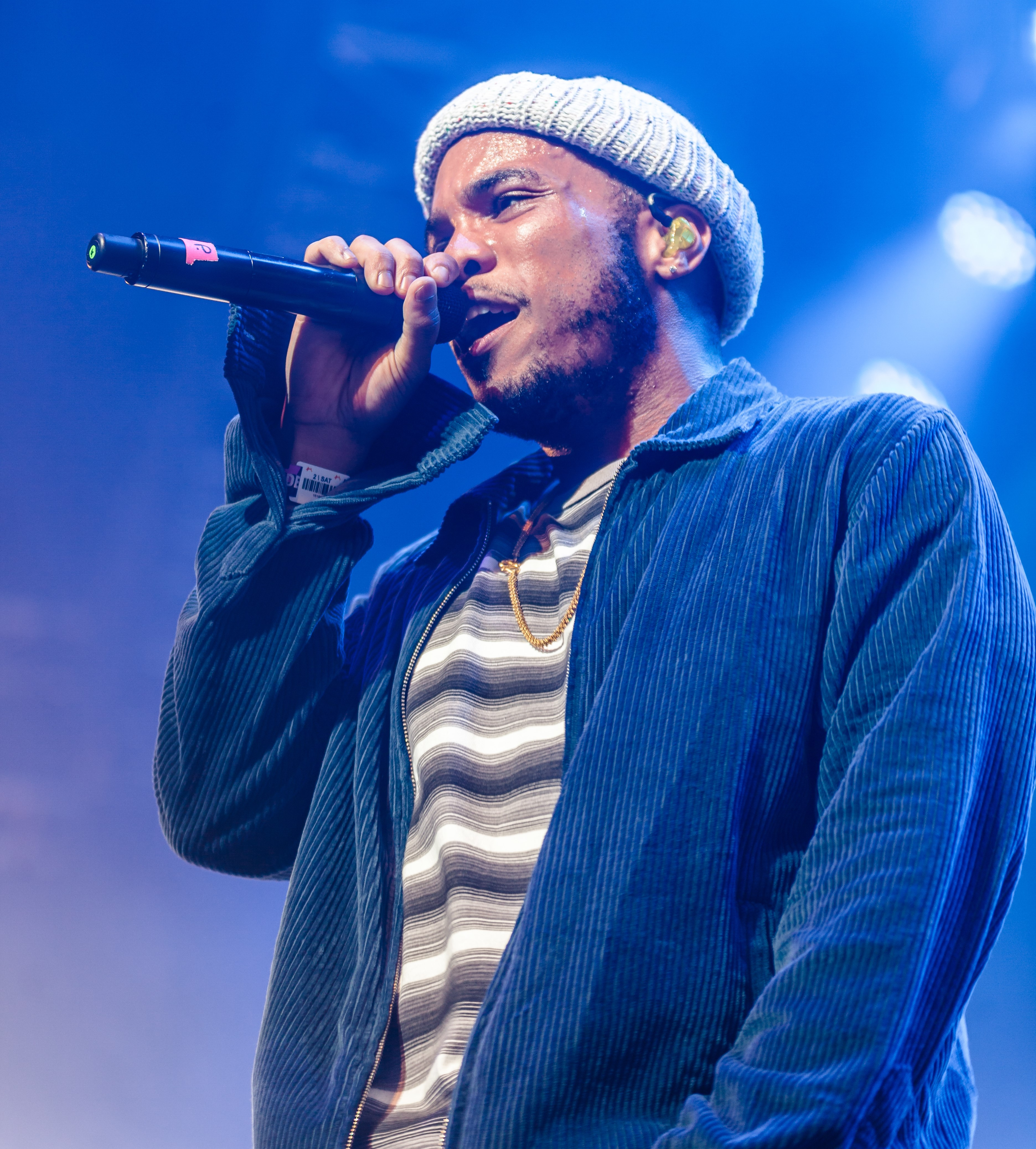
2021 winner, Anderson .Paak

=== 2000s ===
Year^{[I]}	Performing artist(s)	Work
2002
2002	Eve ft. Gwen Stefani	"Let Me Blow Ya Mind"
2002	Ja Rule ft. Case	"Livin' It Up"
2002	Jagged Edge ft. Nelly	"Where the Party At"
2002	Ludacris ft. Nate Dogg	"Area Codes"
2002	Mystic ft. Planet Asia	"W"
2003
2003	Nelly ft. Kelly Rowland	"Dilemma"
2003	Fat Joe ft. Ashanti	"What's Luv?"
2003	Ja Rule ft. Ashanti	"Always on Time"
2003	Nappy Roots ft. Anthony Hamilton	"Po' Folks"
2003	Justin Timberlake ft. Clipse	"Like I Love You"
2004
2004	Beyoncé ft. Jay-Z	"Crazy in Love"
2004	The Black Eyed Peas ft. Justin Timberlake	"Where Is the Love?"
2004	LL Cool J ft. Marc Dorsey	"Luv U Better"
2004	Snoop Dogg ft. Pharrell and Uncle Charlie Wilson	"Beautiful"
2004	Pharrell ft. Jay-Z	"Frontin'"
2005
2005	Usher ft. Ludacris and Lil Jon	"Yeah!"
2005	Kanye West ft. Syleena Johnson	"All Falls Down"
2005	Christina Milian ft. Fabolous	"Dip It Low"
2005	Jadakiss ft. Anthony Hamilton	"Why"
2005	Twista ft. Jamie Foxx and Kanye West	"Slow Jamz"
2006
2006	Linkin Park and Jay-Z	"Numb/Encore"
2006	Gwen Stefani ft. Eve	"Rich Girl"
2006	Destiny's Child ft. T.I. and Lil Wayne	"Soldier"
2006	Common ft. John Legend and Kanye West	"They Say"
2006	Ciara ft. Missy Elliott	"1, 2 Step"
2007
2007	Justin Timberlake ft. T.I.	"My Love"
2007	Akon ft. Eminem	"Smack That"
2007	Beyoncé ft. Jay-Z	"Déjà Vu"
2007	Eminem ft. Nate Dogg	"Shake That"
2007	Jamie Foxx ft. Ludacris	"Unpredictable"
2008
2008	Rihanna ft. Jay-Z	"Umbrella"
2008	Chris Brown ft. T-Pain	"Kiss Kiss"
2008	Akon ft. Snoop Dogg	"I Wanna Love You"
2008	Keyshia Cole ft. Lil' Kim and Missy Elliott	"Let It Go"
2008	Kanye West ft. T-Pain	"Good Life"
2009
2009	Estelle ft. Kanye West	"American Boy"
2009	Flo Rida ft. T-Pain	"Low"
2009	John Legend ft. André 3000	"Green Light"
2009	Lil Wayne ft. T-Pain	"Got Money"
2009	Lupe Fiasco ft. Matthew Santos	"Superstar"

=== 2010s ===
Year^{[I]}	Performing artist(s)	Work
2010
2010	Jay-Z ft. Rihanna and Kanye West	"Run This Town"
2010	Beyoncé ft. Kanye West	"Ego"
2010	Keri Hilson ft. Kanye West and Ne-Yo	"Knock You Down"
2010	The Lonely Island ft. T-Pain	"I'm on a Boat"
2010	T.I. ft. Justin Timberlake	"Dead and Gone"
2011
2011	Jay-Z ft. Alicia Keys	"Empire State of Mind"
2011	B.o.B ft. Bruno Mars	"Nothin' on You"
2011	Chris Brown ft. Tyga and Kevin McCall	"Deuces"
2011	Eminem ft. Rihanna	"Love the Way You Lie"
2011	John Legend ft. The Roots, Melanie Fiona and Common	"Wake Up Everybody"
2012
2012	Kanye West, Rihanna, Kid Cudi and Fergie	"All of the Lights"
2012	Beyoncé and André 3000	"Party"
2012	DJ Khaled, Drake, Rick Ross and Lil Wayne	"I'm On One"
2012	Dr. Dre, Eminem and Skylar Grey	"I Need a Doctor"
2012	Rihanna and Drake	"What's My Name?"
2012	Kelly Rowland and Lil Wayne	"Motivation"
2013
2013	Jay-Z, Kanye West, Frank Ocean and The-Dream	"No Church in the Wild"
2013	Flo Rida and Sia	"Wild Ones"
2013	John Legend and Ludacris	"Tonight (Best You Ever Had)"
2013	Nas and Amy Winehouse	"Cherry Wine"
2013	Rihanna and Jay-Z	"Talk That Talk"
2014
2014	Jay-Z and Justin Timberlake	"Holy Grail"
2014	J. Cole and Miguel	"Power Trip"
2014	Jay-Z and Beyoncé	"Part II (On the Run)"
2014	Kendrick Lamar and Mary J. Blige	"Now or Never"
2014	Wiz Khalifa and The Weeknd	"Remember You"
2015
2015	Eminem ft. Rihanna	"The Monster"
2015	Common ft. Jhené Aiko	"Blak Majik"
2015	ILoveMakonnen ft. Drake	"Tuesday"
2015	Schoolboy Q ft. BJ the Chicago Kid	"Studio"
2015	Kanye West ft. Charlie Wilson	"Bound 2"
2016
2016	Kendrick Lamar ft. Bilal, Anna Wise and Thundercat	"These Walls"
2016	Big Sean ft. Kanye West and John Legend	"One Man Can Change the World"
2016	Common and John Legend	"Glory"
2016	Jidenna ft. Roman GianArthur	"Classic Man"
2016	Nicki Minaj ft. Drake, Lil Wayne & Chris Brown	"Only"
2017
2017	Drake	"Hotline Bling"
2017	Beyoncé ft. Kendrick Lamar	"Freedom"
2017	DRAM ft. Lil Yachty	"Broccoli"
2017	Kanye West ft. Chance the Rapper, Kelly Price, Kirk Franklin and The-Dream	"Ultralight Beam"
2017	Kanye West ft. Rihanna	"Famous"
2018
2018	Kendrick Lamar ft. Rihanna	"Loyalty"
2018	6lack	"Prblms"
2018	GoldLink ft. Brent Faiyaz and Shy Glizzy	"Crew"
2018	Jay-Z ft. Beyoncé	"Family Feud"
2018	SZA ft. Travis Scott	"Love Galore"
2019
2019	Childish Gambino	"This Is America"
2019	Christina Aguilera ft. GoldLink	"Like I Do"
2019	6LACK ft. J. Cole	"Pretty Little Fears"
2019	Kendrick Lamar and SZA	"All the Stars"
2019	Post Malone ft. 21 Savage	"Rockstar"

=== 2020s ===
Year^{[I]}	Performing artist(s)	Work
2020
2020	DJ Khaled ft. Nipsey Hussle and John Legend	"Higher"
2020	Lil Baby and Gunna	"Drip Too Hard"
2020	Lil Nas X	"Panini"
2020	Mustard ft. Roddy Ricch	"Ballin'"
2020	Young Thug ft. J. Cole and Travis Scott	"The London"
2021
2021	Anderson .Paak	"Lockdown"
2021	DaBaby ft. Roddy Ricch	"Rockstar"
2021	Drake ft. Lil Durk	"Laugh Now Cry Later"
2021	Roddy Ricch	"The Box"
2021	Travis Scott	"Highest in the Room"
2022
2022	Kanye West ft. The Weeknd and Lil Baby	"Hurricane"
2022	J. Cole ft. Lil Baby	"Pride Is the Devil"
2022	Doja Cat	"Need to Know"
2022	Lil Nas X ft. Jack Harlow	"Industry Baby"
2022	Tyler, the Creator ft. Youngboy Never Broke Again and Ty Dolla $ign	"WusYaName"
2023
2023	Future ft. Drake and Tems	"Wait for U"
2023	DJ Khaled ft. Future and SZA	"Beautiful"
2023	Jack Harlow	"First Class"
2023	Kendrick Lamar ft. Blxst and Amanda Reifer	"Die Hard"
2023	Latto	"Big Energy" (Live)
2024
2024	Lil Durk ft. J. Cole	"All My Life"
2024	Burna Boy ft. 21 Savage	"Sittin' on Top of the World"
2024	Doja Cat	"Attention"
2024	Drake and 21 Savage	"Spin Bout U"
2024	SZA	"Low"
2025
2025	Rapsody ft. Erykah Badu	"3:AM"
2025	Jordan Adetunji ft. Kehlani	"Kehlani"
2025	Beyoncé, Linda Martell and Shaboozey	"Spaghettii"
2025	Future, Metro Boomin and The Weeknd	"We Still Don't Trust You"
2025	Latto	"Big Mama"
2026
2026	Kendrick Lamar and SZA	"Luther"
2026	Fridayy ft. Meek Mill	"Proud of Me"
2026	JID ft. Ty Dolla Sign and 6lack	"Wholeheartedly"
2026	Terrace Martin and Kenyon Dixon ft. Rapsody	"WeMaj"
2026	PartyNextDoor and Drake	"Somebody Loves Me"
2027
2027	Busta Rhymes and J Dilla ft. D'Angelo	"This Woman"
2027	Cardi B ft. Kehlani	"Safe"
2027	Doechii ft. SZA	"Girl, Get Up"
2027	Don Toliver	"E85"
2027	Wale ft. Leon Thomas	"Watching Us"

^{^[I]} Each year is linked to the article about the Grammy Awards held that year.

== Artists with multiple wins ==
7 wins

- Jay-Z

5 wins

- Rihanna
- Kanye West

3 wins

- Kendrick Lamar

2 wins

- Justin Timberlake
- Drake

== Artists with multiple nominations ==
15 nominations

- Kanye West

12 nominations

- Jay-Z

9 nominations

- Drake
- Rihanna
- Beyoncé (1 shared with Destiny's Child)

7 nominations

- Kendrick Lamar
- John Legend

6 nominations

- SZA

5 nominations

- J. Cole
- Eminem
- Lil Wayne
- T-Pain
- Justin Timberlake

4 nominations

- Common
- Ludacris

3 nominations

- 21 Savage
- 6lack
- Chris Brown
- DJ Khaled
- Future
- Kelly Rowland (1 shared with Destiny's Child)
- Lil Baby
- T.I.
- Travis Scott
- The Weeknd

2 nominations

- Akon
- André 3000
- Ashanti
- Doja Cat
- Nate Dogg
- Snoop Dogg
- The-Dream
- Missy Elliott
- Eve
- Flo Rida
- GoldLink
- Jamie Foxx
- Fergie (1 shared with The Black Eyed Peas)
- Anthony Hamilton
- Jack Harlow
- Ja Rule
- Kehlani
- Latto
- Lil Durk
- Lil Nas X
- Nelly
- Pharrell
- Rapsody
- Roddy Ricch
- Gwen Stefani
- Ty Dolla Sign
- Charlie Wilson

== See also ==
- Grammy Award for Best Rap Performance by a Duo or Group
- Grammy Award for Best Rap Solo Performance
- Grammy Award for Best Rap Song
