= Crew (song) =

Single by GoldLink

Single by GoldLink featuring Brent Faiyaz and Shy Glizzy

from the album At What Cost
- Released: December 16, 2016
- Recorded: 2016
- Genre: Hip hop
- Length: 2:57: 2:52 (radio edit)
- Label: RCA
- Songwriters: D'Anthony Carlos; Teddy Walton; Christopher Wood; Marquis King
- Producer: Walton

GoldLink singles chronology
"See I Miss Pt. 2" (2016)	"Crew" (2016)	"Rough Soul" (2017)

Brent Faiyaz singles chronology
"Poison" (2016)	"Crew" (2016)	"Too Fast" (2016)

Shy Glizzy singles chronology
"Passion" (2016)	"Crew" (2016)	"Benefits" (2017)

Music video
- "Crew" on YouTube

"Crew" is a song by American hip hop recording artist GoldLink featuring American singer Brent Faiyaz and American rapper Shy Glizzy. It was released on December 16, 2016, through RCA Records as the lead single from his debut studio album, At What Cost (2017). Production would be handled by Teddy Walton. The song was a sleeper hit, receiving a nomination for Best Rap/Sung Performance at the 60th Annual Grammy Awards. It contains additional background vocals from Zacari.

== Background and release ==
In an interview with Genius, GoldLink would explain how the record came together: "It was the most natural song I ever did, because I met Brent, and I was with Brent in LA when we did it together. That was the first time I actually met Brent. We were just vibing, and it kind of worked the way it was. He freestyled his, and I freestyled mine. But I guess the only thing I had in my head, “Where I’m from.” The subject matter came from thinking about all the people that helped me get to where I was. To get to the position I was to even be able to get to LA and be in the studio at Pulse, to be with Brent."

== Critical reception ==
The song received acclaim from critics. According to Ross Scarano of Billboard "there wasn't a catchier sung rap hook in 2017", also writing that "Shy Glizzy may have the show-stealing verse, but there's no denying that this raised GoldLink's clout in a major way". Calling it an "excellent rap song", Okayplayer wrote; "The hook is money, the rhymes are top notch and never fall into "mumble" status, and makes the listener feel welcomed along for the ride." Pitchfork wrote that GoldLink "manages to distill his city's amorphous hip-hop scene into a single sound", while Shy Glizzy "darts around with a shouted giddiness, stealing the show with his fist-pumping momentum" and Brent Faiyaz delivers an "elegant chorus" which "could appear on the song two more times and not be enough". Rap-Up called it "a mellow yet unforgettable smash" featuring "Shy Glizzy's awesome flow and Brent Faiyaz's moving crooning over Teddy Walton's smooth production". Jonah Mendelson from The Michigan Daily praised the artists, saying that "every member of the collaboration comes through with some of the best work of their careers", while the song "is a reminder that not every great song has to contain avant-garde experimentation or deep metaphorical meaning — there is a place for well-crafted tracks that are just an enjoyable vibe".

=== Accolades ===
Publication	Accolade	Rank	Ref.
Billboard	The 10 Best Rap Songs of 2017	7	
Complex	The Best Songs of 2017	11	
HipHopDX	The Top Rap Songs of 2017	9	
Medium	Best Songs of 2017 by Clyde McGrady	3	
NPR	The 100 Best Songs of 2017	16	
Okayplayer	The Best Songs of 2017	17	
Pitchfork	The 100 Best Songs of 2017	47	
Rap-Up	20 Best Songs of 2017	17	
Spin	The 101 Best Songs of 2017	70	
The Michigan Daily	Top 10 Songs of 2017	9	

== Remix ==
"Crew Remix"

Single by GoldLink featuring Brent Faiyaz, Gucci Mane, and Shy Glizzy
- Released: June 22, 2017
- Recorded: 2017
- Genre: Hip Hop
- Length: 4:01
- Label: RCA
- Songwriters: D'Anthony Carlos; Teddy Walton; Christopher Wood; Marquis King; Radric Davis
- Producer: Teddy Walton

The official remix of "Crew" features American rapper Gucci Mane and was released on June 21, 2017. A digital extended play (EP)—which included remixes by Lido, Richie Souf, Backyard Band and New Impressionz—was released on August 18, 2017.

== Music video ==
The music video for the song, directed by Matthew Dillon Cohen, premiered via GoldLink's Vevo channel on March 2, 2017. Cohen filmed a prominent portion of the music video in Cheverly, Maryland, a Washington DC suburb.

== Charts ==
=== Weekly charts ===
Chart (2017–19)	Peak position
Canada Hot 100 (Billboard)	97
US Billboard Hot 100	45
US Hot R&B/Hip-Hop Songs (Billboard)	15
US Rhythmic Airplay (Billboard)	13
US R&B/Hip-Hop Airplay (Billboard)	2

=== Year-end charts ===
Chart (2017)	Position
US Hot R&B/Hip-Hop Songs (Billboard)	48

== Certifications ==
Region	Certification	Certified units/sales
New Zealand (RMNZ)	4× Platinum	120,000^{‡}
United Kingdom (BPI)	Gold	400,000^{‡}
United States (RIAA)	8× Platinum	8,000,000^{‡}
^{‡} Sales+streaming figures based on certification alone.
