= Shy Glizzy =

American rapper (born 1992)

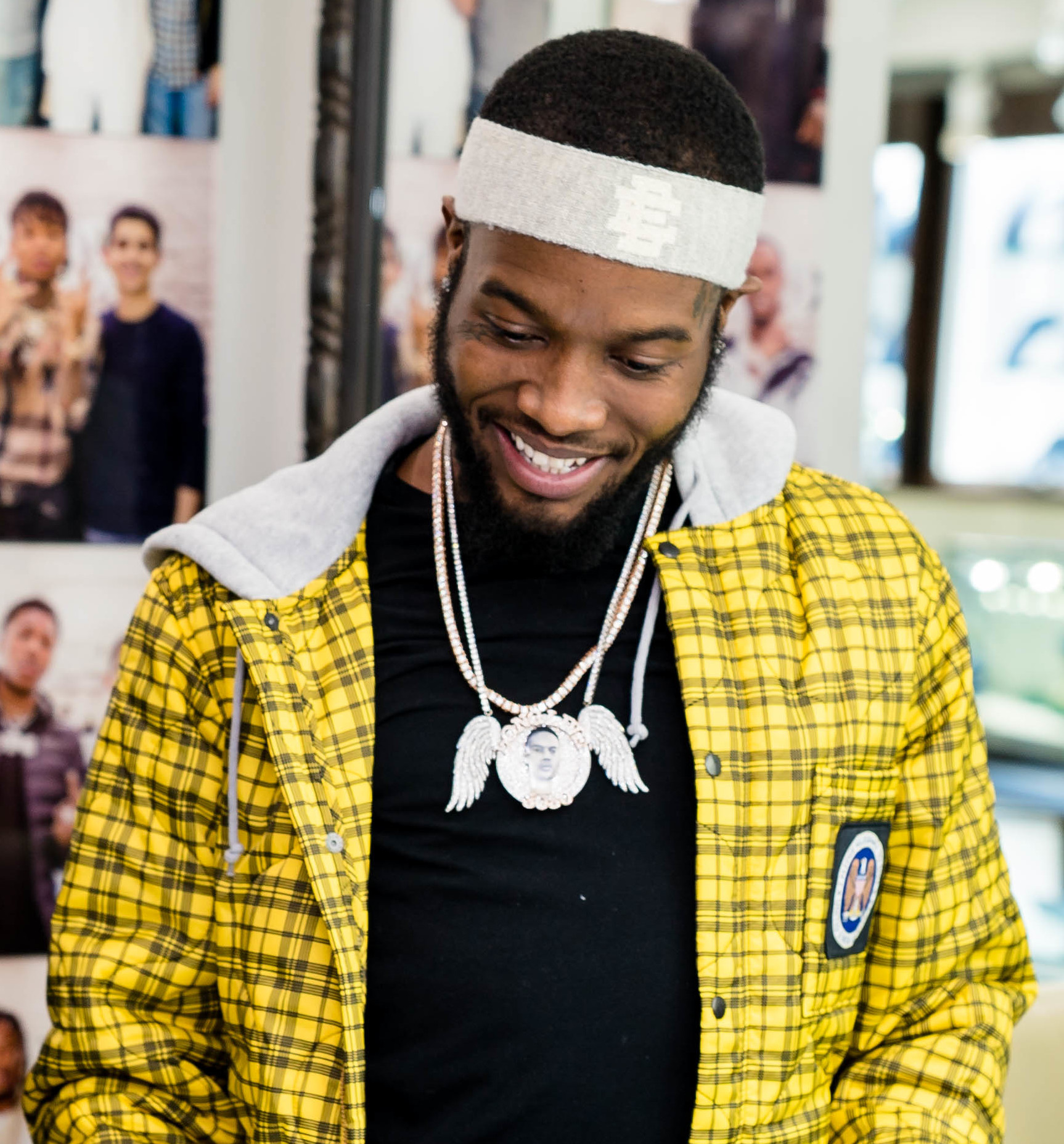
- Shy Glizzy in 2018

Background information
- Also known as: Shy; Jefe
- Born: Marquis Amonte King; December 12, 1992 (age 33); Washington D.C., U.S.
- Genres: DMV hip-hop; trap
- Occupation: Rapper
- Years active: 2010–present
- Labels: Glizzy Gang; 300; Atlantic
- Children: 1
- Website: glizzygang.com

Marquis Amonte King (born December 12, 1992), better known by his stage name Shy Glizzy, is an American rapper from Washington, D.C. He is best known for his guest appearance alongside Brent Faiyaz on GoldLink's 2016 single "Crew", which peaked at number 45 on the Billboard Hot 100 and was nominated for Best Rap/Sung Performance at the 59th Annual Grammy Awards.

== Early life ==
Shy Glizzy was born Marquis Amonte King on December 12, 1992, at Greater Southeast Community Hospital and grew up in Southeast D.C. He received his nickname "Shy" during early childhood. As a teenager, he began reading the Quran, then the daily newspaper and stacks of biographies, before starting to write raps. He was initially "trying to write a book, but it ended up being a song." Shy has stated he did not listen to rap music growing up but rather go-go music, which he credits for helping to create his own unique sound.

== Career ==
=== 2011–2013 ===
In 2011, Shy Glizzy released his debut project, titled No Brain, in January. He released his second mixtape, Streets Hottest Youngin, on October 31.

On June 6, 2012, Shy released his third mixtape titled Law. He was featured by Complex on its list of "10 New DMV Rappers To Watch Out For." The Washington City Paper's Ramon Ramirez referred to it as "a well-connected tape [which] sometimes feels like it wants to be a major-label-debut", featuring guest appearances from Project Pat and Wale and production from Beat Billionaire, but described Shy as being "less polished, and more frenetic, while his hooks are repetitive and droning but also hungry and catchy."

On November 14, 2012, Shy released his fourth mixtape, Fly Money, an 11-track collaborative project with Jose Guapo. On December 12, he released his fifth mixtape, Fxck Rap, featuring a guest appearance from Trinidad James and production from Speaker Knockerz.

On March 16, 2013, Shy Glizzy was listed by Complex as one of "15 Unsigned Rappers Who Should Get a Deal After SXSW". On April 3, he announced his sixth mixtape, Law 2, which went on to be released on August 1, and included guest appearances from the likes of Migos, Yo Gotti, Starlito and Kevin Gates.

=== 2014–2016 ===
On January 7, 2014, Shy Glizzy was listed by Fact as one of "10 Rappers to Watch in 2014". On January 20, he announced his seventh mixtape, Young Jefe, which went on to be released on February 17, and included guest appearances from the likes of Young Scooter, PeeWee Longway, Young Thug, Plies and Gudda Gudda. From that mixtape, the hit single "Awwsome" turned into the biggest song of his career and peaked at number 45 on the US Hot R&B/Hip-Hop Songs chart. It spawned a remix off the record that features A$AP Rocky and 2 Chainz that grabbed more than 750,000 streams on SoundCloud in the first week of its release.

On June 3, 2015, Shy Glizzy was selected as part of the XXL magazine Freshman Class list. That same day he released his ninth mixtape, Be Careful, a 16-track collaborative project with his Glizzy Gang collective which included members 30 Glizzy, Goo Glizzy and 3 Glizzy. On August 28, Shy announced his 10th mixtape, For Trappers Only, entirely produced by Zaytoven to be released on September 30. It included guest appearances from the likes of Boosie Badazz, Yo Gotti and Ty Dolla $ign.

On July 8, 2016, Shy Glizzy announced his 11th mixtape, Young Jefe 2, to be released on July 15.

In a December 2014 interview with The Fader, when asked about his thoughts on DMV rap, Shy responded "DMV still didn't become a thing. Nobody opened up a lane for DMV rap [...] I opened up my lane. I opened up Glizzy Gang lane, the southeast DC lane." However, in a January 2017 interview with The Fader, when asked about the state of DC's rap scene, Shy responded "I'm trying to open up that lane so more youngsters can come through. No one else ever opened that door for me [...] I got a whole culture—the D, the M, and the V—to put on for."

=== 2017–present ===
On January 6, 2017, Shy Glizzy released an EP, The World is Yours, under the stage name Jefe. HipHopDX's Aaron McKrell described it as "an energetic but hollow offering" but praised Shy Glizzy's delivery and "ability to manipulate vocal sonics." He rated the project 2.7 out of 5. Pitchfork's Sheldon Pearce stated that it "isn't King at the peak of his powers [...] Here, he mostly seems content to roll leisurely through verses" and showed "no sense of urgency." He rated the project 6.9 out of 10.

The single "Take Me Away" was released on September 29, dedicated to the memory of 30 Glizzy who was found dead a few weeks earlier. He released his 12th mixtape Quiet Storm on December 12, which he described as his "best body of work yet."

In 2018, Shy Glizzy released his debut studio album, Fully Loaded, on October 18, which included guest appearances from YoungBoy Never Broke Again, Lil Uzi Vert, Young Thug, Gunna, and Rick Ross. The album received positive reviews and peaked at number 35 on the US Billboard 200, selling 14,446 album-equivalent units in the first week. It was announced that Glizzy will embark on nationwide tour with Atlanta rapper Gunna on his Drip or Drown 2 tour.

In an April 2019 interview with HipHopDX's Daniela Evgenivna, Glizzy announced he would be releasing his second studio album titled Covered 'N Blood on April 19. He described the album as being more personal than the feature packed Fully Loaded stating "It's a really deep album. A lot of my music is like a diary. This one is about what I've been going through the last few months." On April 19, Covered n' Blood was released as Glizzy's second Billboard 200-charting record, peaking at 156. Shy ended 2019 with a second mixtape titled Aloha, inspired by and recorded on the island of Hawaii.

On April 10, 2020, he released the single "Lonely Vibes". He released the song "Right Or Wrong" with Lil Uzi Vert on June 19. On September 18, 2020, Shy Glizzy released his new project, Young Jefe 3. It was preceded by a video for "Forever Tre 7", featuring No Savage, a new signee to Glizzy's label, Glizzy Gang Records, an imprint under 300 Entertainment.

== Personal life ==
In 2012, King stated that he is Muslim.

== Discography ==
=== Studio albums ===
| Title | Details | Peak chart positions |
| Title | Details | US |
|---|---|---|
| Fully Loaded | Released: October 12, 2018; Label: 300 Entertainment, Glizzy Gang; Format: Digital download | 35 |
| Flowers | Released: February 10, 2023; Label: 300 Entertainment, Glizzy Gang; Format: Digital download | — |
| I Was Actually Being Humble | Released: December 12, 2025; Label: Glizzy Gang; Format: Digital download | — |

=== EPs ===
List of extended plays, with selected details
| Title | Details | Peak chart positions |
| Title | Details | US R&B/HH |
|---|---|---|
| The World Is Yours (as Jefe) | Released: January 6, 2017; Label: 300 Entertainment, Glizzy Gang | 37 |
| Aloha | Released: August 30, 2019; Label: 300 Entertainment, Glizzy Gang | — |

=== Mixtapes ===
List of mixtapes, with selected details
| Title | Details | Peak chart positions | |
| Title | Details | US | US R&B/HH |
|---|---|---|---|
| No Brainer | Released: January 19, 2011 | — | — |
| Streets Hottest Youngin | Released: October 31, 2011 | — | — |
| Law | Released: June 6, 2012 | — | — |
| Fly Money (with Jose Guapo) | Released: November 14, 2012 | — | — |
| Fxck Rap | Released: December 12, 2012 | — | — |
| Law 2 | Released: August 1, 2013 | — | — |
| Young Jefe | Released: February 17, 2014 | — | — |
| Law 3: Now or Never | Released: December 2, 2014 | — | 47 |
| Be Careful (with Glizzy Gang) | Released: June 3, 2015 | — | — |
| For Trappers Only (with Zaytoven) | Released: September 30, 2015 | — | — |
| Young Jefe 2 | Released: July 15, 2016 | 134 | 14 |
| Quiet Storm | Released: December 12, 2017 | — | — |
| Covered n' Blood | Released: April 19, 2019; Label: 300 Entertainment, Glizzy Gang; Format: Digital download | 156 | — |
| Young Jefe 3 | Released: September 18, 2020; Label: 300 Entertainment, Glizzy Gang; Format: Digital download, streaming | 118 | — |

=== Singles ===
==== As lead artist ====
List of singles as lead artist, with selected chart positions, showing year released and album name
| Title | Year | Peak chart positions | Certifications | Album |
| Title | Year | US R&B /HH | Certifications | Album |
|---|---|---|---|---|
| "Awwsome" (Solo or remix featuring 2 Chainz and ASAP Rocky) | 2014 | 45 | | Young Jefe |
| "Funeral" (Remix) (featuring Jeezy) | 2015 | — | | Non-album singles |
| "Fan Club" (featuring Lil Uzi Vert) | 2016 | — | | Non-album singles |
| "Take Me Away" | 2017 | — | | Quiet Storm |
| "Do You Understand?" (featuring Gunna and Tory Lanez) | 2018 | — | RIAA: Gold | Fully Loaded |
| "Where We Come From" (featuring YoungBoy Never Broke Again) | 2018 | — | | Fully Loaded |
| "Lonely Vibes" | 2020 | — | | Young Jefe 3 |
| "Right Or Wrong" (featuring Lil Uzi Vert) | 2020 | — | | Young Jefe 3 |
| "Borderline" (featuring EST Gee) | 2022 | — | | Flowers |
| "MMY Freestyle" | 2022 | — | | Non-album singles |
| "Steppin On Sh!t" | 2022 | — | | Flowers |
| "Underrated" | 2022 | — | | Flowers |
| "Slime-U-Out" (featuring 21 Savage) | 2022 | — | | Flowers |
| "Fools Fall N Love" (featuring YoungBoy Never Broke Again) | 2023 | — | | Flowers |
"—" denotes a recording that did not chart or was not released in that territory.

==== As featured artist ====
List of singles as featured artist, with selected chart positions, showing year released and album name
| Title | Year | Peak chart positions | | Certifications | Album |
| Title | Year | US | US R&B /HH | Certifications | Album |
|---|---|---|---|---|---|
| "Crew" (GoldLink featuring Brent Faiyaz and Shy Glizzy) | 2016 | 45 | 15 | RIAA: 9× Platinum | At What Cost |

== Awards and nominations ==
| Year | Awards | Category | Nominated work | Result |
|---|---|---|---|---|
| 2013 | O Music Awards | Make a Band Famous | Himself | Nominated |
| 2018 | Grammy Awards | Best Rap/Sung Performance | "Crew" (with GoldLink and Brent Faiyaz) | Nominated |
