= At What Cost =

Studio album by GoldLink
- Released: March 24, 2017
- Genre: Hip hop
- Length: 48:00
- Label: RCA
- Producer: Obii Say (exec.); Axlfoile; Steve Lacy; Matt Martians; Teddy Walton; KAYTRANADA; Louie Lastic; Sevn Thomas; Syk Sense; Taz Arnold

GoldLink chronology
And After That, We Didn't Talk (2015)	At What Cost (2017)	Diaspora (2019)

Singles from At What Cost
- 1. "Crew" Released: December 16, 2016; 2. "Meditation" Released: March 10, 2017; 3. "Pray Everyday (Survivor's Guilt)" Released: March 17, 2017

At What Cost is the debut studio album by American hip hop recording artist GoldLink. It was released on March 24, 2017, by RCA Records. The album features guest appearances from Wale, Shy Glizzy, Steve Lacy, Jazmine Sullivan, Kaytranada, Mýa, Brent Faiyaz, Ciscero, Kokayi, Hare Squead, Radiant Children, April George and Lil Dude. The album received positive reviews and has sold just over 500,000 copies, as of June, 2021.

== Background ==
In 2015, GoldLink released his second mixtape, And After That, We Didn't Talk on Soulection to critical acclaims. In 2016, it was announced that GoldLink had signed a major deal with RCA Records. To celebrate him signing to RCA, GoldLink and Soulection released a remixed version of And After That, We Didn't Talk. Later that year, he released his new single "Fall In Love" featuring fellow DC rapper and close friend Cisero, produced by BADBADNOTGOOD and Kaytranada.

== Reception ==
Professional ratings
Aggregate scores
Source	Rating
Metacritic	71/100
Review scores
Source	Rating
Exclaim!	7/10
HipHopDX	4.1/5
Pitchfork	7.5/10
PopMatters	5/10

At What Cost received positive reviews from critics. The album holds a score of 71/100 based on 5 reviews, indicating "generally favorable reviews".

== Track listing ==
No.	Title	Writer(s)	Producer	Length
1.	"Opening Credit"	D'Anthony Carlos; Javon Gant		1:07
2.	"Same Clothes As Yesterday" (featuring Ciscero)	Carlos; Michael Anthony White, Jr.; Everett Ray; Alexander Ben-Abdallah; Ciscero Simmons	Darth Olympian; Ray; Louie Lastic^{[a]}	3:20
3.	"Have You Seen That Girl?"	Carlos; Louis Kevin Celestin	KAYTRANADA	2:42
4.	"Hands On Your Knees" (featuring Kokayi)	Carlos; Celestin; Carl Walker	KAYTRANADA	1:55
5.	"Meditation" (featuring Jazmine Sullivan and Kaytranada)	Carlos; Celestin; Jazmine Sullivan; Michael Denne; Ken Gold	KAYTRANADA	4:18
6.	"Herside Story" (with Hare Squead)	Carlos; Tony Lomena; Jessy Kalala; Henoc Cubuca; Felix Joseph	Hare Squead; Joseph	3:03
7.	"Summatime" (featuring Wale and Radiant Children)	Carlos; Marco Bernardis; Olubowale Akintimehin; Fabienne Holloway	Radiant Children	3:43
8.	"Roll Call" (featuring Mýa)	Carlos; Ben-Abdallah; Fred David Jenkins; Jamar Aaron Beckett; Mýa Harrison	Louie Lastic	3:20
9.	"The Parable of the Rich Man" (featuring April George)	Carlos; Matt Martin; Taz Arnold	Matt Martians; Arnold^{[a]}; Bill Pettaway^{[a]}	4:19
10.	"Crew" (featuring Brent Faiyaz and Shy Glizzy)	Carlos; Travis Walton; Christopher Wood; Marquis King	Walton	2:59
11.	"We Will Never Die" (featuring Lil Dude)	Carlos; Rupert Thomas, Jr.; Guy Clark	Sevn Thomas	4:02
12.	"Kokamoe Freestyle"	Carlos; Sidney Swindail	Swindail	3:43
13.	"Some Girl" (featuring Steve Lacy)	Carlos; Lacy; Arnold	Lacy; Arnold	5:42
14.	"Pray Everyday (Survivor's Guilt)"	Carlos; Thomas Jr.; Joshua Scruggs; Axel Morgan	Sevn Thomas; Syk Sense; Axl Folie	3:47
Total length:				48:00

Notes

- ^{^[a]} signifies an additional producer.

== Charts ==
Chart (2017)	Peak position
US Billboard 200	127
US R&B/Hip-Hop Album Sales (Billboard)	36

== Certifications ==
Region	Certification	Certified units/sales
New Zealand (RMNZ)	Platinum	15,000^{‡}
United States (RIAA)	Gold	500,000^{‡}
^{‡} Sales+streaming figures based on certification alone.
