= Diaspora (GoldLink album) =

Studio album by GoldLink
- Released: June 12, 2019
- Length: 39:52
- Label: RCA
- Producer: Ari PenSmith; GoldLink; P2J; Blinky Bill; Deats; EY; Fwdslxsh; Juls; Kurtis McKenzie; MD$; Michael Uzowuru; OBR; Rascal; Sean Momberger; Teo Halm

GoldLink chronology
At What Cost (2017)	Diaspora (2019)	HARAM! (2021)

Singles from Diaspora
- 1. "Zulu Screams" Released: May 13, 2019; 2. "Joke Ting" Released: May 31, 2019; 3. "U Say" Released: June 6, 2019

Diaspora is the second studio album by American rapper GoldLink, released on June 12, 2019, by RCA Records. It follows the release of his previous album At What Cost (2017), and features guest appearances from Pusha T, Tyler, the Creator, Khalid, Wizkid, Jay Prince, Bibi Bourelly, WSTRN, Jackson Wang, Maleek Berry, Ari PenSmith, Lil Nei and WaveIQ.

== Artwork ==
The album cover features singer and model Justine Skye, his girlfriend at the time, in neon green light, wearing '90s-style sunglasses with her hair pulled back and few earrings. It was photographed by Hailey Bieber.

== Critical reception ==
Professional ratings
Aggregate scores
Source	Rating
Metacritic	82/100
Review scores
Source	Rating
Clash	8/10
Exclaim!	8/10
HipHopDX	4.2/5
Now	3/5
Pitchfork	8.0/10

Diaspora received a score of 82 out of 100 based on reviews from six critics on review aggregator Metacritic, indicating "universal acclaim". Briana Younger argued in The New Yorker that the album comments on Blackness as a global phenomenon, observing that each of its songs "can be seen to represent some facet of blackness".

== Track listing ==
Diaspora track listing
No.	Title	Writer(s)	Producer(s)	Length
1.	"//error"	D'Anthony Carlos; Ariowa Irosogie; Ashly Williams; Brienna DeVlugt; Gabrielle Carriero; Kristal Smith; Richard Isong; Shyann Roberts	Ari PenSmith; GoldLink; P2J	0:22
2.	"Joke Ting" (featuring Ari PenSmith)	Carlos; Irosogie; Isong; Tavon Thompson	Ari PenSmith; P2J	3:00
3.	"Maniac"	Carlos; Bibi Bourelly; Isong; Rory O'Brien; Thompson	OBR; P2J	3:10
4.	"Days Like This" (featuring Khalid)	Carlos; Khalid Robinson; Michael Uzowuru; Teo Halm	Uzowuru; Halm	2:49
5.	"Zulu Screams" (featuring Maleek Berry and Bibi Bourelly)	Carlos; Antonio Nvuala; Irosogie; Maleek Berry; Isong	P2J	2:58
6.	"More" (featuring Lola Rae)	Carlos; Irosogie; Rachel Akosua Funmilola Garton; Isong	P2J	3:07
7.	"Cokewhite" (featuring Pusha T)	Carlos; Adeyinka Bankole; Kurtis McKenzie; Isong; Santeri Kauppinen; Sean Momberger; Terrence Thornton	Fwdslxsh; McKenzie; MD$; P2J; Momberger	3:25
8.	"U Say" (featuring Tyler, the Creator and Jay Prince)	Carlos; Jazon Kawu-Eugenio; Julian Nicco-Annan; Tyler Gregory Okonma	Juls	3:21
9.	"Yard" (featuring Haile of WSTRN)	Carlos; Irosogie; Ras Haile Aalexander; Isong	P2J	3:16
10.	"Spanish Song" (featuring WaveIQ)	Carlos; Irosogie; Isong; Thompson	Ari PenSmith; P2J	3:32
11.	"No Lie" (featuring WizKid)	Carlos; Bankole; Ayodeji Ibrahim Balogun; Bourelly; Casyo Johnson; Dominik Patrzek; Karl Wilson; Isong	Ari PenSmith; Deats; P2J	3:24
12.	"Tiff Freestyle"	Carlos; Sellanga Ochieng	Blinky Bill	1:43
13.	"Rumble" (featuring Jackson Wang and Lil Nei)	Carlos; Canei Williams; Jackson Wang; Thompson; Tobias Breuer	Rascal	3:12
14.	"Swoosh"	Carlos; Irosogie; Bourelly; Eyobed Getachew; Isong	EY	2:40
Total length:				39:52

== Charts ==
Chart performance for Diaspora
Chart (2019)	Peak position
Australian Albums (ARIA)	70
Belgian Albums (Ultratop Flanders)	148
Dutch Albums (Album Top 100)	87
US Billboard 200	77
US Top R&B/Hip-Hop Albums (Billboard)	40
