= Soulection =

Music collective in Los Angeles, California, US

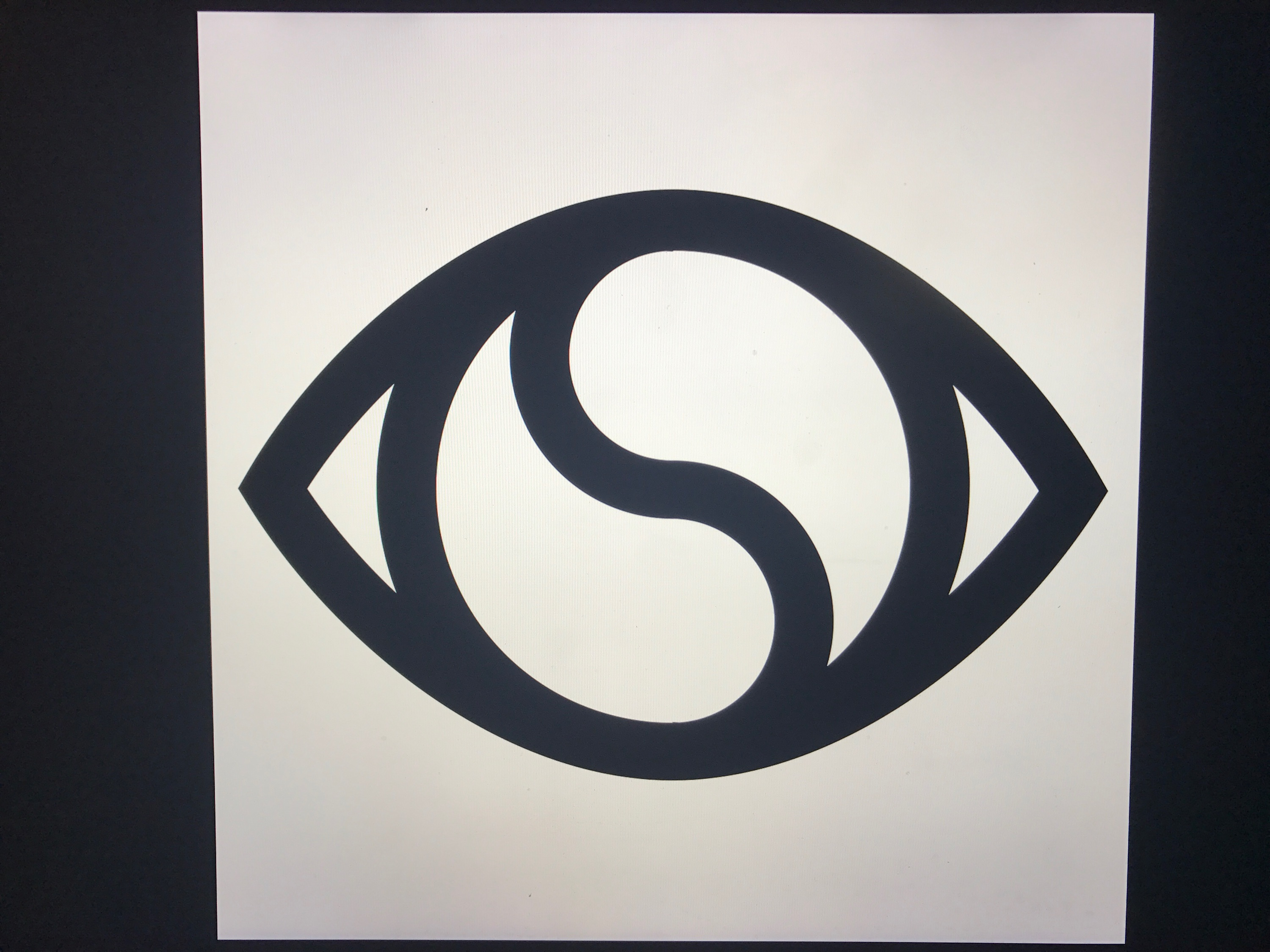
Soulection Logo

Soulection is a Los Angeles-based music collective that serves as a platform and community for artists, musicians, and fans from across the world. DJ Joe Kay and artists Guillaume 96' Bonte and Andre Power collaborated to establish the brand in 2011. Today, Soulection exists as an Apple Music 1 radio show on Beats1 Radio, an independent music label, festival, world-touring concert and clothing line. The brand defines itself as uniting a "borderless, genre-bending musical movement".

== Founders ==
=== Joe Kay ===
Joe Kay is a Southern California native. He is a co-founder and current CEO and Head of Artists and Repertoire of Soulection. Kay started a musical compilation podcast out of his grandmother's basement known as "Illvibes" in the summer of 2007. Joe Kay transferred to California State University, Long Beach in 2011. A meeting with the program director and general manager of the university's radio station, KBeach Radio, secured Kay radio time that very same day.

=== Andre Power ===
Andre Power is a co-founder and current creative director of Soulection. Power attended art school in San Diego and was a listener of Kay's Illvibes podcast. After participating in the event as an artist, Power became involved with organizing San Diego's Art in the Park. In 2010, Power invited Kay to DJ at Art in the Park and soon after made Kay a resident at the event.

=== Guillaume Bonte ===
Guillaume Bonte is a French artist known as "96". He is a co-founder of Soulection. Bonte was an Internet friend of Joe Kay and Andre Power. Bonte is accredited with creating the Soulection logo. His initial role in Soulection was art director.

== Early stages ==
Kay and Bonte initially conceptualized Soulection as a blog and platform for the community to arts and culture. After growing impatient to website development delays, the two created compilations of music they liked. Soulection ultimately formed as an extension of Kay's podcast, Illvibes. Kay envisioned two sides to Soulection: a radio show and original material released by Soulection. On January 24, 2011, the first show of Soulection Radio (Show #1) aired for an hour on KBeach Radio. The first Soulection compilation was released on the same day as well. With only a splash page and zip file of the radio show, they received 5000 downloads in their first compilation all through organic outreach. The release was a compilation of 29 different artists. After the 2011 Tōhoku earthquake and tsunami in Japan, Soulection was contacted by Australian producer Ta-ku. Ta-ku proposed that the beat tape he had recently made within 24 hours, be released through Soulection and the proceeds of the release be donated to tsunami relief. Their second release, 24, was released for free on Bandcamp with an option for donation. Soulection's fifth release, Mood by Evil Needle, became its best-selling release to date. The fourteen song album was released on October 31, 2011. Joe Kay says it was around the time of this release that the Soulection team decided to seriously pursue the expansion of the Soulection brand. Soulection continued to release music under the Soulection label, releasing over 30 albums by 2015.

== Apple Music and Beats-1 Radio ==
Beats1 Radio Logo

In June 2015, Apple announced its streaming music service, Apple Music. Apple Music's first broadcasting station was called Beats 1 Radio. Beats 1 Radio was led by DJs Zane Lowe, Ebro Darden, and Julie Adenuga and was contributed to by artists such as Drake, Q-Tip, Pharrell Williams, Dr. Dre, and Elton John. Soulection was among the list of names chosen to serve as a tastemaker for the broadcast. The first Soulection radio show broadcast on Beats 1 Radio on July 4, 2015. The show aired their 500th episode on April 11, 2021.

== The Soulection brand ==
=== Independent music label ===
Soulection has released 78 records including albums, singles, EPs, and compilations since 2011. Artists such as Sango, GoldLink, Sam Gellaitry, Monte Booker, IAMNOBODI, Tom Misch, and even popular streetwear brand Stüssy have worked to release music with the label. 2021 releases under the Soulection label include Ari PenSmith's City Girl: Acoustic Performance, Jayla Darden's Exhausted My Options, Phabo's Soulquarius & Slippery, AYLØ's Clairsentience LIVE and three works from Lou Val: Tayo and the Dreamer, Eternal Sunshine, and Cruel Silence.

=== Experiences ===
Soulection also functions as a touring festival and concert attraction. The brand holds a monthly event, The Sound of Tomorrow, in Los Angeles. Their festival, dubbed "Soulection Experience", hosts a variety of artists and genres. The group has been commissioned to perform in a variety of venues, as well. In 2013, Coachella invited the group to perform at the southern Californian festival. In 2015, Soulection performed to a sold-out crowd in the "Whale Room" displayed in The American Museum of Natural History in New York.

=== Merchandise line ===
Soulection has also developed a merchandise line of clothing apparel and lifestyle items. Around the time of their 2014 music compilation, Stüssy and Soulection collaborated to release special edition t-shirts. In March 2015, they worked with Dutch brand Daily Paper to design and create 300 limited-edition windbreakers. Soulection estimates that about 60-70% of their overall revenue comes from merchandise and about 20-30% comes from selling music.

== Current team ==
Soulection Team
Name	Position
Joe Kay	CEO Founder Head of A&R
Andre Power	Co-founder Creative Director
Sahar Habibi	Director of Soulection Records & Operations
Dom Prieto	Chief Operating Officer
Andres Javier Uribe	Director of Worldwide Bookings & Production

== Discography ==
=== 2011 ===
Title	Artist	Release date
Compilation	Soulection	January 23, 2011
24	Ta-Ku	March 31, 2011
Sankofa	AbJo	August 21, 2011
The Sound of Tomorrow	BMB SpaceKid	September 26, 2011
Mood	Evil Needle	October 30, 2011
Luck & Love	Insightful	December 26, 2011
Balanced	J-Louis	February 21, 2013
Gradient	ESTA	March 7, 2013
Pictures on Silence	Atu	March 21, 2013

=== 2012 ===
Title	Artist	Release date
Trust Me	Sango	February 28, 2012
Outputs 3	Koen	March 26, 2012
They Soulection	Pheo	March 29, 2012
Endless Fro	Kings	May 14, 2012
Wasser	Jazzo & Melodiesinfonie	May 21, 2012
Attoseconds	Sunclef	May 31, 2012
Sunwalk	Modlee & Vlopper	June 4, 2012
Da Rochina	Sango	June 14, 2012
Esoteric	LAKIM	August 6, 2012
Night Driven	Tryezz	August 27, 2012
Moments	Koloah	September 6, 2012
Bootyleg	Nangdo	September 20, 2012
Never Too Late	Staycen x Koen	October 14, 2012
The Shy Lanterns Glow	Insightful	October 21, 2012
Pick Your Own Poison	Waldo	November 23, 2012
Wohlklänge EP	Melodiesinfonie	December 3, 2012
Opera	Harrisson BlackOldman	December 13, 2012
Anagoge	AbJo	December 27, 2012

=== 2013 ===
Title	Artist	Release date
Balanced	J-Louis	February 21, 2013
Gradient	Esta	March 7, 2013
Time In Between	Soulection	April 4, 2013
North	Sango	July 22, 2013
In Bloom	Dpat	August 26, 2013
Elevated	IAMNOBODI	September 30, 2013
Soulection White Label: 001	LAKIM	November 1, 2013
Soulection White Label: 002	Da-P	November 14, 2013
Steps	Jo Def	November 18, 2013
Thank You	Soulection	December 1, 2013
Soulection White Label: 003	Jarreau Vandal	December 12, 2013
Soulection White Label: 004	starRo	December 26, 2013

=== 2014 ===
Title	Artist	Release date
Soulection White Label: 005	Zikomo	January 9, 2014
3 Years of Soulection	Soulection	January 23, 2014
This is Her	LAKIM	February 24, 2014
Soulection White Label: 006	MIKOS DA GAWD	March 6, 2014
Soulection White Label: 007	Losco	March 27, 2014
Soulection White Label: 008	Tom Misch	April 10, 2014
Unbound	Dpat	April 23, 2014
Soulection White Label: 009	AbJo	April 24, 2014
100k	Soulection	May 13, 2014
Constructive Interference	Evil Needle & Sivey	June 23, 2014
Soulection White Label: 010	J-Louis	August 14, 2014
Stüssy Collaboration	Soulection	September 5, 2014
Soulection White Label: 011	Pyrmdplaza	October 16, 2014
Soulection White Label: 012	Singularis	October 30, 2014
Soulection White Label: 013	oriJanus	November 26, 2014

=== 2015 ===
Title	Artist	Release date
Soulection White Label: 015	Chris McClenney	January 15, 2015
Short Stories	Sam Gellaitry	February 17, 2015
Hours Spent Loving You	SPZRKY & Sango	March 8, 2015
Love is King	Soulection	March 17, 2015
May (feat. Ravyn Lenae)	Monte Booker	May 30, 2015
Soulection White Label: 015	Louie Lastic	July 23, 2015
Soulection White Label: 016	Monte Booker	October 29, 2015
Soulection White Label: 017	Sivey	December 11, 2015

=== 2016 ===
Title	Artist	Release date
Soulection White Label: 018	ROMderful	March 14, 2016
Summatime Fine	Mars Today	August 12, 2016
Mona Lisa	Monte Booker & Naji	December 2, 2016

=== 2017 ===
Title	Artist	Release date
Promise Once More	Soulection	January 29, 2017
To Me	Bowtye & Avalon Young	February 11, 2017
Soulection White Label: 019	DKVPZ	March 16, 2017
Dreaming	Bowtye	April 13, 2017
buries	Che Ecru	April 24, 2017
Soulection White Label: 020	Foisey	August 17, 2017
Unite	Soulection	October 11, 2017
Soulection White Label: 021	j. robb	November 3, 2017
Might Just (feat Krs. & Kingbmjn)	Naji	December 2, 2017

=== 2018 ===
Title	Artist	Release date
Soulection White Label:022	Jared Jackson	May 17, 2018
Soulection Black Label: Hablot Brown	Hablot Brown	July 29, 2018
1997	Tay Iwar	August 25, 2018
Soulection Black Label: Devin Tracy	Devin Tracy	September 30, 2018

=== 2019 ===
Title	Artist	Release date
Gemini	Tay Iwar	March 29, 2019

=== 2020 ===
Title	Artist	Release date
Fufu & Grits	Juls & Sango	May 28, 2020
Tesuto	Mansur Brown	July 9, 2020
City Girl	Ari PenSmith & Jonah Cristian	September 10, 2020
Da Rochina 4	Sango	September 24, 2020
Romantic	AYLØ	October 7, 2020
Soon As You Get Home	Rose Gold	October 14, 2020
LNF	Phabo	November 18, 2020
GEMS IN THE CORNERSTORE	Elujay & j. robb	December 3, 2020
Clairsentience	AYLØ	December 19, 2020

=== 2021 ===
Title	Artist	Release date
Clairsentience LIVE	AYLØ	March 26, 2021
Slippery	Phabo	April 9, 2021
Cruel Silence	Lou Val	May 7, 2021
Eternal Sunshine	Lou Val	May 7, 2021
Tayo and The Dreamer	Lou Val	June 25, 2021
Soulquarius	Phabo	July 16, 2021
Exhausted My Options	Jayla Darden	August 26, 2021
City Girl (Acoustic Performance)	Ari PenSmith	September 10, 2021
