= Speaker Knockerz =

American rapper and producer (1994–2014)

Background information
- Also known as: Jamol Junior
- Born: Derek McAllister Jr. November 6, 1994; The Bronx, New York City, U.S.
- Died: March 6, 2014 (aged 19) Columbia, South Carolina, U.S.
- Genres: Hip hop; trap
- Occupations: Rapper; record producer; songwriter
- Years active: 2010–2014
- Label: Talibandz Entertainment (also referred to as TBG)

Derek McAllister Jr. (November 6, 1994 – March 6, 2014), known professionally as Speaker Knockerz, was an American rapper and record producer. Raised in Columbia, South Carolina, he began his music career as a producer, teaching himself and selling instrumentals while still a teenager. In the early 2010s, Speaker Knockerz began rapping and releasing mixtapes. Active during the rise of internet-based hip-hop and gaining attention through self-released music and online promotion, his music gained wider attention in 2013 with the release of the song "Lonely," which spread widely on social media.

On March 6, 2014, Speaker Knockerz was found dead in his garage at his home in South Carolina. Authorities reported no signs of foul play, and his death was later believed to have been caused by carbon monoxide poisoning. He was 19 years old. Following his death, his work has since been cited by later artists as influential within early 2010s internet-era hip-hop and influential in the melodically-driven state of modern rap.

== Early and personal life ==
Speaker Knockerz would spend the first years of his life in New York City. His father Derek McAllister Sr. was sentenced to 10 years in prison while the family lived in the city. With his father's imprisonment, Speaker Knockerz's mother made the decision to move to Columbia, South Carolina in order to avoid an unhealthy environment. It is during his time in South Carolina that the aspiring rapper developed his passion for hip-hop music and its creation. In 2010, his father came back home having completed his sentence. Being a musician himself, Derek McAllister Sr. was able to assist his son with the creation of his first mixtape Flight Delayed.

== Career ==
At 13, he started using Fruity Loops after seeing a video of American rapper Soulja Boy doing the same. Around 2010-2011, Speaker Knockerz sold his first instrumental to a Miami rapper for $50 and used the money to buy an affordable pair of speakers. As a producer, Speaker Knockerz produced for rappers Gucci Mane, Young Scooter, French Montana, and Shy Glizzy. In Spring 2012, he began rapping under his current moniker as a means of promotion for his record production. In 2013, he would release two mixtapes: Married to the Money and Finesse Father. He would also release his first music video "Money" produced by his friend Loud Visuals. In September 2013, he released the music video to his track "Rico Story Part 1". In December 2013, he released his track "Lonely" alongside an accompanying music video. This would be the song that would make him gain mainstream attention, as people would start to promote his music on the social media platform Vine and he would end up buying a black Chevrolet Camaro at the age of 19. At the time of his passing, he had 49 tracks available for purchase on iTunes. In May 2014, his family posthumously released the music video for the last song he released during his lifetime "Erica Kane". In September 2014, his mixtape Married to the Money II was posthumously released.

== Death ==
On March 6, 2014, Speaker Knockerz was found dead in his garage at his home in South Carolina. Coroner Gary Watts said that foul play was not suspected and an autopsy found no signs of trauma. The Richland County Coroner later confirmed that there were no signs of drugs or foul play involved. His death was ruled as natural causes, more specifically a heart attack. In a 2023 interview, his mother said his cause of death had been widely misrepresented and did not involve either drugs nor a heart attack. His mother also claimed at the time that she was not quite ready to provide details around his passing. It is now believed he died of carbon monoxide poisoning from running his car in a closed garage. During this time, it was reported that McAllister was going through a break-up, leading fans to speculate that his death was possibly a suicide. However, these speculations have no evidence behind them. He was 19 years old.

== Legacy ==
On August 21, 2014, Florida rapper Kodak Black released a remix of Speaker Knockerz's song "Lonely" called "Off A 14". In a 2016 unreleased song by American rapper Lil Uzi Vert titled "Alone Time", the rapper paid tribute to Speaker Knockerz. In February 2016, American rapper Denzel Curry paid tribute to Speaker Knockerz in his song "Knotty Head". In an August 2018 interview with XXL American rapper Lil Mosey revealed that Speaker Knockerz set the groundwork for his production style. During a November 2018 interview with The Fader, American rapper Roddy Ricch called Speaker Knockerz one of his biggest inspirations musically. In November 2019, American rapper Kevin Gates released his song "By My Lonely", which samples Speaker Knockerz's song "Lonely" as an homage to the late rapper. The song peaked at number 86 on the Billboard Hot 100. In February 2022, Los Angeles rapper OhGeesy released a song titled "Appetizer" in which he pays tribute to Speaker Knockerz in the second verse when he says, "Speaker Knockerz, I'm bumping Erica Kane". In November 2022, rapper Tee Grizzley called Speaker Knockerz's song "RICO Story" one of his favorite storytelling rap songs.

== Musical style ==
Writing for Complex, David Drake describes Speaker Knockerz' style in the following manner: "Enraptured by the sounds of the recent wave of Chicago artists, the Speaker Knockerz sound had a melodic, carefully-crafted feel. While there was something of a street edge to his approach, relative to influences like Lil Durk, there was an optimism and naivete to the Speaker Knockerz sound. He was a bedroom auteur, not a gangster. He shed the hardened shell of drill's aesthetic, focusing his energies on two contrasting moods: a euphoric enthusiasm, and a deep, aching melancholy."

== Discography ==
=== As lead artist ===
| Title | Year | Certifications | Album |
|---|---|---|---|
| "Lonely" | 2013 | RIAA: Platinum | Married to the Money |
| "Freak Hoe" | 2013 | RIAA: Platinum | Finesse Father |

Studio albums

- Flight Delayed (2010) as Jamol Junior, re-released 2016 as Speaker Knockerz
- Married to the Money (2013)
- Finesse Father (2013)

Posthumous studio albums

- Married to the Money II (2014)
- The GOAT (2024)
