= GoldLink =

American rapper and singer (born 1993)

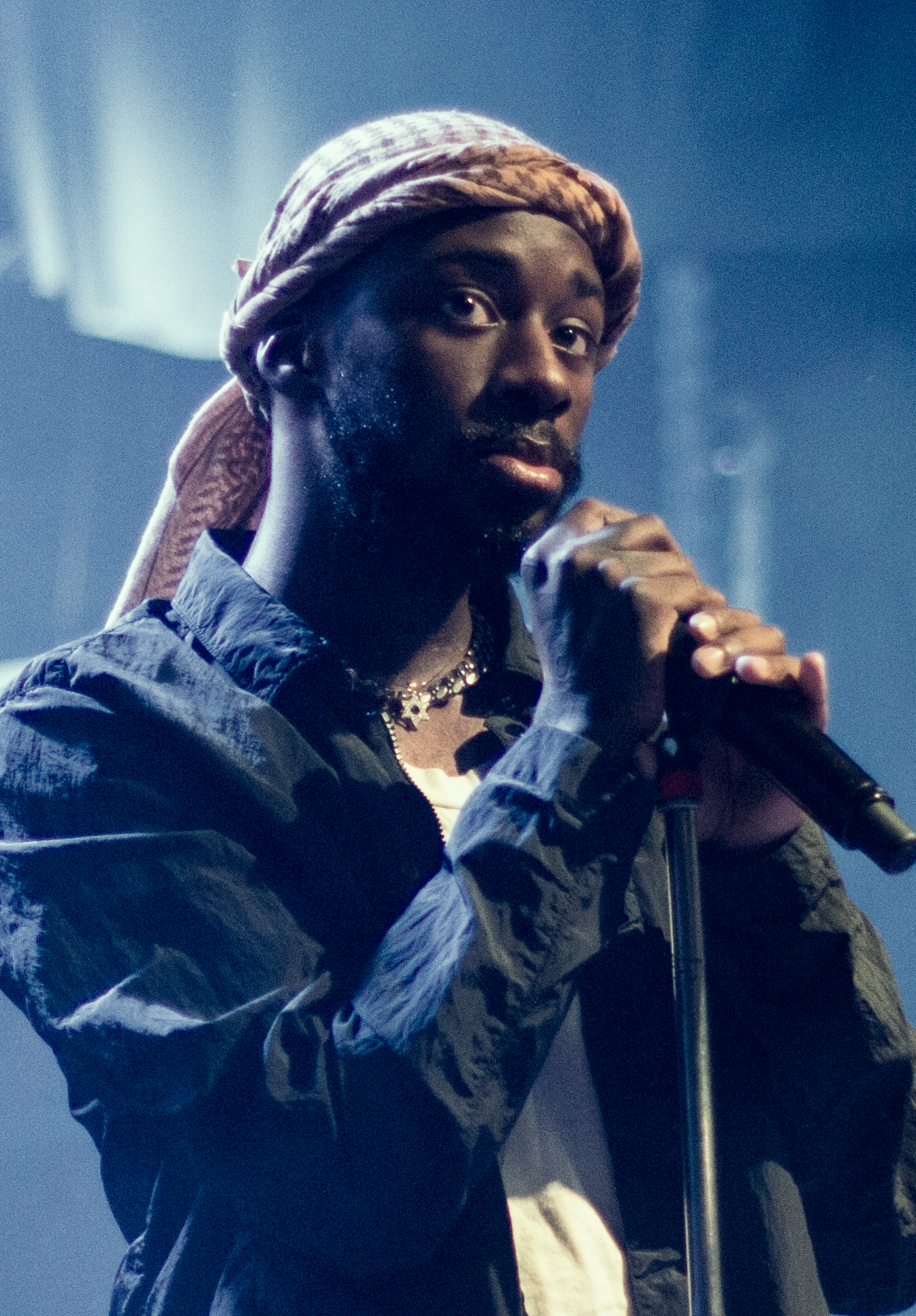
- GoldLink performing in 2017

Background information
- Born: D'Anthony William Carlos; May 17, 1993 (age 33); Washington, D.C., U.S.
- Origin: Falls Church, Virginia, U.S.
- Genres: DMV hip-hop; alternative hip-hop; R&B; electronica
- Occupations: Rapper; singer; songwriter
- Years active: 2013–present
- Labels: RBC; BMG; RCA; Soulection; Squaaash Club
- Website: goldlink.info

D'Anthony William Carlos (born May 17, 1993), better known by his stage name GoldLink, is an American rapper and singer from Washington, D.C. He gained recognition following the release of his critically acclaimed debut mixtape, The God Complex (2014). In 2015, he was chosen as part of the XXL Freshman Class and self-released his second mixtape, And After That, We Didn't Talk, before signing with RCA Records.

Carlos's 2016 single, "Crew" (featuring Brent Faiyaz and Shy Glizzy), peaked at number 45 on the Billboard Hot 100, received sextuple platinum certification by the Recording Industry Association of America (RIAA), and was nominated for Best Rap/Sung Performance at the 59th Annual Grammy Awards. It preceded his debut studio album At What Cost (2017), which was met with continued positive reception despite trailing the single's commercial success. His second album, Diaspora (2019), entered the Billboard 200 at number 77; his third album, Haram! (2021), failed to chart and served as his final release with RCA.

== Career ==
=== 2013–16: Beginnings and breakthrough ===
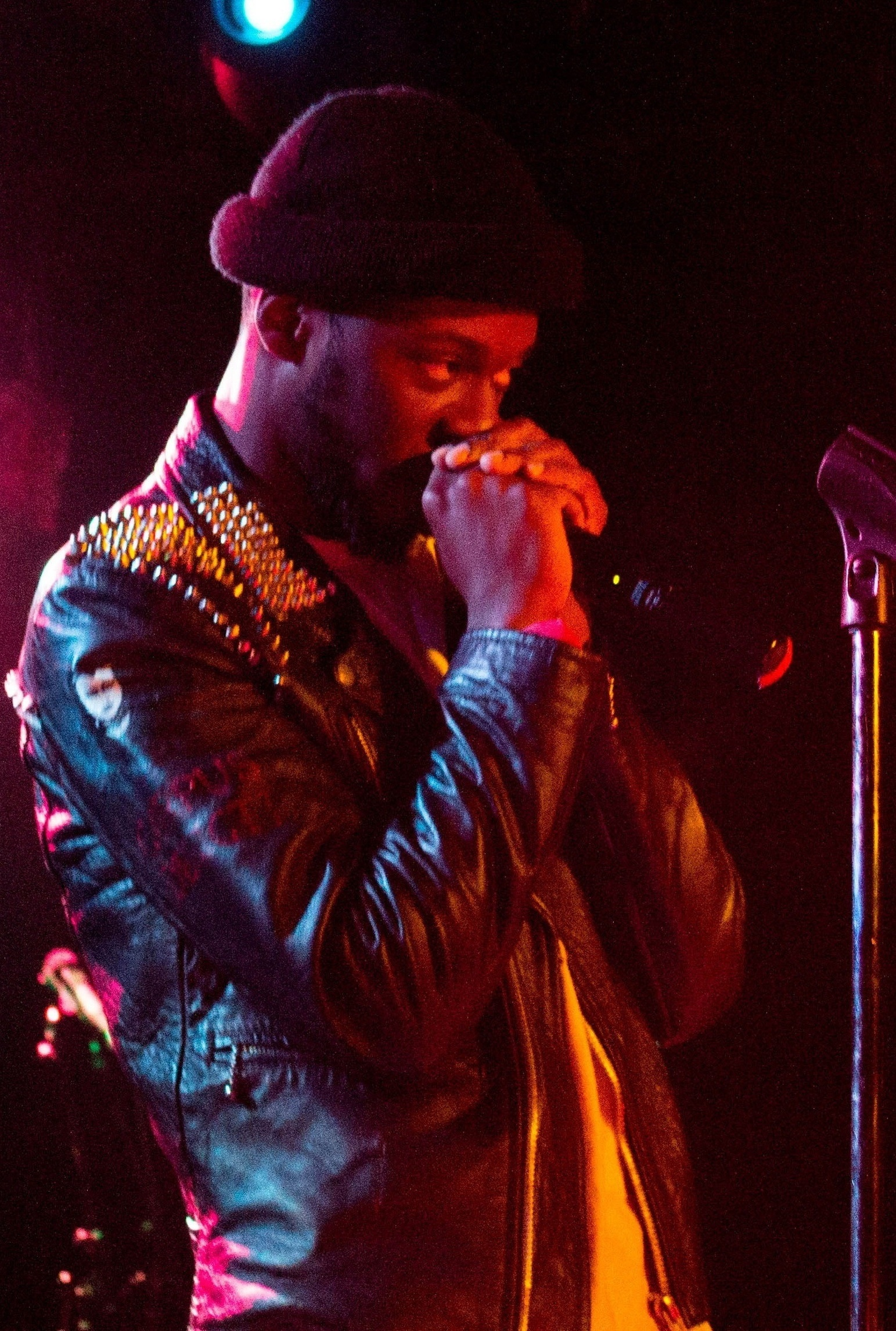
Carlos performing in May 2015

Carlos began his career performing under his birth name D'Anthony Carlos. He began making music as a hobby after graduating high school at Hayfield Secondary School, eventually recording tracks in a local studio in Falls Church, Virginia named Indie Media Lab. He released his first tracks on Bandcamp under the name Gold Link James. It was in 2013 that he began performing as GoldLink, releasing several tracks on SoundCloud.

Carlos released his first mixtape The God Complex in July 2014. Complex named it one of the best projects released during the first half of 2014, Spin placed it at number 19 on its The 40 Best Hip-Hop Albums of 2014, Clash ranked it at number 7 on their Top 10 Mixtapes of 2014 and Pitchfork Media gave the mixtape a 7.9 rating.

Carlos began collaborating with producer Rick Rubin in 2015. In November 2015 he released the mixtape And After That, We Didn't Talk, much of which was considered a follow-up to questions left unanswered from The God Complex. Pigeons & Planes placed it at number 19 on its Best Albums of 2015 list. Carlos was also named a member of the XXL Freshman Class in 2015. In 2016, Carlos signed a major deal with RCA Records and revealed he is working on his debut album for the label. He released the single "Fall In Love" featuring rapper Cisero and produced by Canadian band BADBADNOTGOOD and Canadian producer and DJ Kaytranada. He later released the song "Untitled" with TDE rapper Isaiah Rashad. In December of that year, he saw his furthest commercial success following the release of his single "Crew" (featuring Shy Glizzy and Brent Faiyaz). It entered the Billboard Hot 100 at number 45, received six-times platinum certification by the RIAA, and earned a Grammy Award nomination for Best Rap/Sung Collaboration; the single also spawned a remix by Georgia rapper Gucci Mane.

=== 2017–present: At What Cost and Diaspora ===
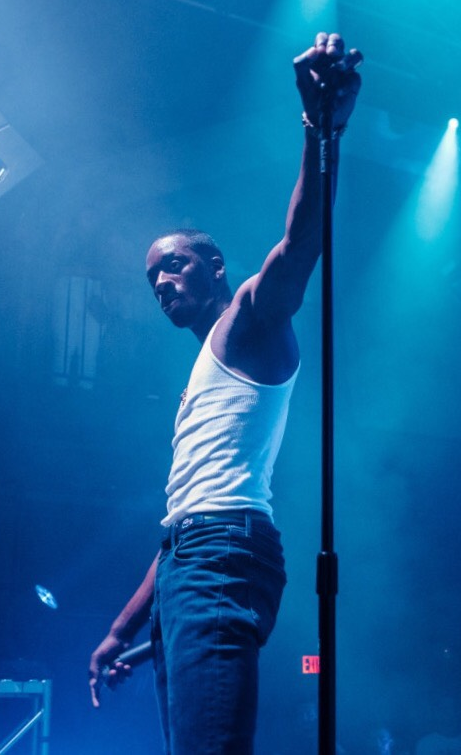
Carlos in 2016

In February 2017, Carlos took part in "Red Bull Sound Selects" 3 Days Miami among artists Kelela, Angel Olsen, Brika, and others. On March 24, 2017, he released his debut album, At What Cost. It featured guest appearances from Wale, Shy Glizzy, Steve Lacy, Jazmine Sullivan, Kaytranada, Mýa, Ciscero, Kokayi, Hare Squead, Radiant Children, April George and Lil Dude. The project debuted at number 128 on the US Billboard 200 chart. Apart from "Crew", it also spawned the single "Meditation".

On June 7, 2018, Carlos was featured on the song "Like I Do" by American singer Christina Aguilera from her eighth studio album, Liberation, which was nominated for Best Rap/Sung Performance at the 61st Annual Grammy Awards.

On June 12, 2019, Carlos released his second studio album Diaspora. In an interview with Wonderland Magazine, he said that he considered "At What Cost" to be his breakout mixtape due to a label agreement and "Diaspora" as his debut album.

On June 18, 2021, Carlos released his third studio album Haram!. In the run up to the album release, Carlos began trolling some of his fellow rappers, tweeting insults and threats at Sheck Wes and sporting a fake facial jewel on his forehead in a July 13, 2021 The Tonight Show Starring Jimmy Fallon appearance, in apparent mockery of the facial jewelry trend popularized by Lil Uzi Vert and Sauce Walka. In the album's first single, "White Walls," Carlos continued his disses of Sheck Wes. The feud with Wes dates back to 2019 when Carlos's then-girlfriend Justine Skye accused Wes of abuse, stalking, and harassment.

He released his fourth studio album, Enoch, on May 30, 2025.

== Personal life ==
=== Early life ===
Carlos's father was a parks and recreation worker and his mother a secretary at a law firm. His parents eventually separated and he moved to Bowie, Maryland with his mother and eventually settled in Virginia. He graduated from Hayfield Secondary School in Alexandria, Virginia.

=== Controversy ===
On November 26, 2019, Carlos wrote a post on Instagram that outlined both his appreciation for American rapper Mac Miller, who died of an accidental overdose in 2018, and his belief that Miller intentionally took the sound of And After That, We Didn't Talk for his album The Divine Feminine (2016). Carlos claimed he showed Miller his album while they were on tour together for Miller's previous album, GO:OD AM (2015), and that the rapper loved it and had him play it for the touring crew. Carlos pointed to similarities in both albums’ structures and the use of American singer Anderson .Paak for the lead singles. Paak responded in an Instagram post of his own, criticizing Carlos for having a "God Complex" and being disrespectful regarding Miller's death. On November 28, Carlos spoke about the post at a concert in Hamburg, Germany, focusing on the love he expressed for Miller and stated that he never accused him of stealing.

== Discography ==
=== Studio albums ===
List of studio albums, with selected chart positions
Title	Album details	Peak chart positions					Certifications
Title	Album details	US	US R&B /HH	AUS	BEL (FL)	NLD	Certifications
At What Cost	Released: March 24, 2017; Label: RCA Records; Format: Digital download, LP, CD	127	36	—	—	—	RIAA: Gold
Diaspora	Released: June 12, 2019; Label: RCA, Squaaash Club; Format: Digital download, LP, CD	77	40	70	148	87	
Haram!	Released: June 18, 2021; Label: RCA, Sony; Format: Digital download, streaming	—	—	—	—	—	
Enoch	Released: May 30, 2025; Label: RBC Records, BMG; Format: Digital download, streaming	—	—	—	—	—	
"—" denotes a recording that did not chart or was not released in that territory.

=== Mixtapes ===
List of mixtapes, with selected chart positions
Title	Mixtape details	Peak chart positions	Certifications
Title	Mixtape details	US R&B /HH	Certifications
The God Complex	Released: July 22, 2014; Label: Squaaash Club; Format: Digital download	—	
And After That, We Didn't Talk	Released: November 8, 2015; Label: Soulection; Format: Digital download, vinyl	21	
"—" denotes a recording that did not chart or was not released in that territory.

=== Singles ===
==== As lead artist ====
List of singles as lead artist, with selected chart positions, showing year released and album name
Title	Year	Peak chart positions		Certifications	Album
Title	Year	US	US R&B /HH	Certifications	Album
"Sober Thoughts"	2015	—	—		The God Complex
"Dance on Me"	2015	—	—		And After That, We Didn't Talk
"Spectrum"	2015	—	—		And After That, We Didn't Talk
"Fall in Love" (featuring Ciscero)	2016	—	—		Non-album singles
"See I Miss Pt. 2" (featuring Marsha Ambrosius)	2016	—	—		Non-album singles
"Crew" (featuring Brent Faiyaz and Shy Glizzy)	2016	45	15	RIAA: 8× Platinum; BPI: Silver	At What Cost
"Rough Soul" (featuring April George)	2017	—	—		Non-album single
"Meditation" (featuring Kaytranada and Jazmine Sullivan)	2017	—	—		At What Cost
"Got Friends" (featuring Miguel)	2018	—	—		Non-album single
"Loud" (with Silk City and Desiigner)	2018	—	—		Electricity
"Zulu Screams" (featuring Maleek Berry and Bibi Bourelly)	2019	—	—		Diaspora
"Joke Ting" (featuring Ari Pen-Smith)	2019	—	—		Diaspora
"U Say" (featuring Tyler, the Creator and Jay Prince)	2019	—	—		Diaspora
"—" denotes a recording that did not chart or was not released in that territory.

==== As featured artist ====
List of singles as featured artist, showing year released and album name
Title	Year	Album
"FBGM" (BMB Spacekid featuring GoldLink)	2015	Non-album singles
"Aquafina" (Falcons featuring GoldLink and Chaz French)	2015	Non-album singles
"Compromise" (Christian Rich featuring GoldLink)	2015	FW14
"Sticks and Horses" (George Maple featuring GoldLink)	2016	Lover
"Nobody" (LEISURE featuring GoldLink)	2016	Leisure
"Together" (Kaytranada featuring AlunaGeorge & GoldLink)	2016	99.9%
"Boo You Know" (Falcons featuring GoldLink)	2017	Non-album singles
"Far Gone" (Burns featuring Johnny Yukon and GoldLink)	2017	Non-album singles
"Through Enough" (VanJess featuring GoldLink)	2017	Silk Canvas
"Wide Open" (Deante' Hitchcock featuring GoldLink)	2017	So Much For Good Luck
"Nobody" (Niia featuring GoldLink)	2017	Non-album single
"Function" (Ciscero featuring GoldLink, April George and Cheakaity)	2018	Devil's Pie
"Like I Do" (Christina Aguilera featuring GoldLink)	2018	Liberation
"Open" (Mýa featuring GoldLink)	2019	TKO (The Knock Out)
"Vex Oh" (Kaytranada featuring GoldLink, Eight9Fly & Ari PenSmith)	2019	Bubba

=== Other certified songs ===
List of other certified songs, showing year released and album name
Title	Year	Certifications	Album
"Herside Story" (with Hare Squead)	2017	RIAA: Gold	At What Cost
"Black Balloons" (Denzel Curry featuring Twelve'len and GoldLink)	2019	ARIA: Gold	Ta13oo

=== Guest appearances ===
List of non-single guest appearances, with other performing artists, showing year released and album name
Title	Year	Other artist(s)	Album
"Hi Lo"	2018	Chloe x Halle	The Kids Are Alright
"Black Balloons"	2018	Denzel Curry, Twelve'len	Ta13oo
"Something Real"	2019	Adé, Wale	Always Something
"Prescriptions"	2019	lilbootycall	Jesus Said Run It Back
"Babouche"	2019	Jidenna	85 to Africa
"Severed Head"	2020	Gorillaz, Unknown Mortal Orchestra	Song Machine, Season One: Strange Timez

== Awards and nominations ==
Year	Awards	Category	Nominated work	Result	Ref.
2018	Grammy Awards	Best Rap/Sung Performance	"Crew" (with Brent Faiyaz and Shy Glizzy)	Nominated	
2018	iHeartRadio Music Awards	Best New Hip-Hop Artist	Himself	Nominated	
2018	BET Awards	Best New Artist	Himself	Nominated	
2019	Grammy Awards	Best Rap/Sung Performance	"Like I Do" (with Christina Aguilera)	Nominated	
