= Supa Bwe =

American hip hop artist

- Also known as: Freddy Got Magic
- Born: Frederick Burton; October 4, 1989 (age 37); Chicago, Illinois, U.S.
- Genres: Hip hop; punk rap
- Occupations: Rapper; singer; songwriter; record producer; audio engineer
- Years active: 2012–present
- Formerly of: Hurt Everybody

Frederick S. Burton (born October 4, 1989), known professionally as Supa Bwe (pronounced boy/boo/bwee) is an American rapper, singer, songwriter, record producer and audio engineer from the West Side of Chicago, Illinois. He was in the group Hurt Everybody with Qari and producer Mulatto Beats. He released his debut album, Finally Dead on December 6, 2017, featuring Xavier Omar, Saba and more. The album premiered at number 3 on iTunes and has received critical acclaim from the likes of XXL, Hype Best, and many more. He has also collaborated with Chance the Rapper on multiple songs.

== Early life ==
Supa Bwe was raised by his English-born mother who is Black, Native American and Scottish. He attributes his music education to the music she exposed him to as a young child, including Punk and Metal bands such as Rage Against the Machine and Korn. His father is attributed with introducing him to Hip Hop. In an August 2016 interview in XXL Magazine he described the effect of these early influences, "I grew up listening to a wide array of music. My mom is from the United Kingdom and my dad is from the projects. I got a lot of punk influences and alternative rock, a lot of things from the 1990s. My pop, all that hood [stuff]. He loves Master P, Busta Rhymes, [stuff] like that. I got an introduction to both worlds."

== Discography ==
Solo albums

- Finally Dead (2017)
- Just Say Thank You (2019)
- Jaguar (2019)
- NO THANKS (2022)
- IRREDEEMABLE (as Freddy Got Magic) (2026)

Mixtapes/EPs

- Magic City (2014)
- 10-4 (2014)
- The Dead Occasion (2015)
- I Know Where The Light Goes (2015)
- Masouleum (2015)
- Dead Again (2015)
- Dead Again 2 (2015)
- Dead Again 3 (2016)
- Issa EP (2016)

with Hurt EveryBody

- Hurt Everybody EP (2014)
- 2K47 (2015)
