= Hare Squead =

Irish rap duo

- Origin: Dublin, Ireland
- Genres: Hip hop; R&B
- Years active: 2013–present
- Members: Tony Konstone; Lilo Blues
- Past members: Jessy Rose
- Website: Hare Squead on Instagram

Hare Squead are an Irish rap duo from Dublin.

== Career ==
Hare Squead's music has been described as a combination of trap, rap, R&B, pop, jazz and electronic music. They formed in 2013 as a trio, singer Jessy Rose and rappers Tony Konstone and Lilo Blues (formerly known as E-Knock). Their first single, If I Ask, was released in 2016 having just been signed to Columbia Records and supporting Nas and Joey Bada$$. In 2016, they toured as the supporting act for Dua Lipa. In 2015, they played at the Body and Soul stage at Electric Picnic and Hard Working Class Heroes festival.

Rose left the group in 2017, citing his mental health as the reason for leaving. This resulted in the group leaving Columbia Records. Konstone and Blues moved to London to pursue their career as a duo, releasing the single 100 Miles in 2019. The duo were featured in a live social media broadcast of London Mayoral candidate Rory Stewart who was live streaming as he canvassed for votes. They released the single Minor Gangsters (Gully) in 2019, inspired by their encounter with Stewart who had referred to them as "minor gangsters". They later spoke out about the conversation, stating that Stewart was being "opportunistic" in approaching them to take part in the video, and Diane Abbott stated that Stewart had been racist.

== Discography ==
=== Extended plays ===
- Supernormal (2016)
- Superweird (2020)
- Superquick (2022)

=== Singles ===
- "If I Ask" (2016)
- "Long Way to Go" (2016)
- "Herside Story" (2016)
- "Loco" (2016)
- "Herside Story" with GoldLink (2017)
- "Pure" (2017)
- "Flowers" (2017)
- "100 Miles" (2019)
- "Petty" featuring Shauna Shadae & Wusu (2019)
- "Meeting with Myself" featuring Jay Prince (2019)
- "Minor Gangsters (Gully)" (2020)
- "Baeboo" (2020)
- "Disloyal WTF" (2020)
- "Handle Bars" (2021)
- "Late Night Flex" with Shauna Shadae (2022)
