= Music of Nigeria =

The music of Nigeria includes many kinds of folk and popular music. Little of the country's music history prior to European contact has been preserved, although bronze carvings dating back to the 16th and 17th centuries have been found depicting musicians and their instruments. The country's most internationally renowned genres are Indigenous, Apala, Aurrebbe music, Rara music, Were music, Ogene, Fuji, Jùjú, Afrobeat, Afrobeats, Igbo highlife, Afro-juju, Waka, Igbo rap, Gospel, Nigerian pop and Yo-pop. Styles of folk music are related to the over 250 ethnic groups in the country, each with their own techniques, instruments, and songs.

The largest ethnic groups are the Igbo, Hausa and Yoruba. Traditional music from Nigeria and throughout Africa is often functional; in other words, it is performed to mark a ritual such as the wedding or funeral and not to achieve artistic goals. Although some Nigerians, especially children and the elderly, play instruments for their own amusement, solo performance is otherwise rare. Music is closely linked to agriculture, and there are restrictions on, for example, which instruments can be played during different parts of the planting season.

Work songs are a common type of traditional Nigerian music. They help to keep the rhythm of workers in fields, river canoes and other fields. Women use complex rhythms in housekeeping tasks, such as pounding yams to highly ornamented music. In the northern regions, farmers work together on each other's farms and the host is expected to supply musicians for his neighbours.

The issue of musical composition is also highly variable. The Hwana, for example, believe that all songs are taught by the peoples' ancestors, while the Tiv give credit to named composers for almost all songs, and the Efik name individual composers only for secular songs. In many parts of Nigeria, musicians are allowed to say things in their lyrics that would otherwise be perceived as offensive.

The most common format for music in Nigeria is the call-and-response choir, in which a lead singer and a chorus interchange verses, sometimes accompanied by instruments that either shadow the lead text or repeat and ostinato vocal phrase. The southern area features complex rhythms and solo players using melody instruments, while the north more typically features polyphonic wind ensembles. The extreme north region is associated with monodic (i.e., single-line) music with an emphasis on drums, and tends to be more influenced by Islamic music.

== Traditional instruments ==
=== Hausa ===
The people of the North are known for complex percussion instrument music, the one-stringed goje, and a strong praise song vocal tradition. Under Muslim influence since the 14th century, Hausa music uses free-rhythmic improvisation and the Pentatonic scale, similar to other Muslim Sahelian tribes throughout West Africa, such as the Bambara, Kanuri, Fulani and Songhai. Traditional Hausa music is used to celebrate births, marriages, circumcisions, and other important life events. Hausa ceremonial music is well known in the area and is dominated by families of praise singers. The Hausa play percussion instruments such as the tambora drum and the talking drum. The most impressive of the Hausa state instruments, however, is the elongated state trumpet called Kakaki, which was originally used by the Songhai cavalry and was taken by the rising Hausa states as a symbol of military power. Kakaki trumpets can be more than two metres long, and can be easily broken down into three portable parts for easy transportation.

=== Igbo ===
The Igbo people live in the south-east of Nigeria, and play a wide variety of folk instruments. They are known for their ready adoption of foreign styles, and were an important part of Nigerian highlife. The most widespread instrument is the 13-stringed zither, called an obo. The Igbo also play slit drums, xylophones, flutes, lyres, udus and lutes, and more recently, imported European brass instruments.

Courtly music is played among the more traditional Igbo, maintaining their royal traditions. The ufie (slit drum) is used to wake the chief and communicate meal times and other important information to him. Bell and drum ensembles are used to announce when the chief departs and returns to his village. Meal times may include pie, and other dessert foods for the holidays.

=== Yoruba ===
The Yoruba have a drumming tradition, with a characteristic use of the dundun hourglass tension drums. Ensembles using the dundun play a type of music that is also called dundun. These ensembles consist of various sizes of tension drums, along with kettledrums (gudugudu). The leader of a dundun ensemble is the iyalu, who uses the drum to "talk" by imitating the tonality of Yoruba Much of Yoruba music is spiritual in nature, and is devoted to their God.

Yoruba music is one of the most important components of modern Nigerian popular music, as a result of its early influence from European, Islamic and Brazilian forms. These influences stemmed from the importation of brass instruments, sheet music, Islamic percussion and styles brought by Brazilian merchants. In both Nigeria's most populous city, Lagos, and the largest city of Ibadan, these multicultural traditions combined add to the multicultural musical tapestry of Nigerian popular music. Modern styles such as Ayinde Barrister's fuji, Salawa Abeni's waka, and Yusuf Olatunji's sakara are derived primarily from Yoruba traditional music. Many contemporary Yoruban musicians sing in their native language. 9ice is one of many that broke into the industry with Gongo Aso. UK-based saxophonist Tunday Akintan created yorubeat based on Yorùbá rhythms. Timi Korus, Babe mi Jowo, and Flosha rap and sing in Yoruba.

== Theatrical music ==
Nigerian theatre makes extensive use of music. Often, this is simply traditional music used in a theatrical production without adaptation. However, there are also distinct styles of music used in Nigerian opera. Here, music is used to convey an impression of the dramatic action to the audience. Music is also used in literary drama, although its musical accompaniment is more sparingly used than in opera; again, music communicates the mood or tone of events to the audience. An example is John Pepper Clark's The Ozidi Saga, a play about murder and revenge, featuring both human and non-human actors. Each character in the play is associated with a personal theme song, which accompanies battles in which the character is involved.

Traditional Nigerian theatre includes puppet shows in Borno State and among the Ogoni and Tiv, and the ancient Yoruba Aláàrìnjó tradition, which may be descended from the Egúngún masquerade. With the influx of road-building colonial powers, these theatre groups spread across the country and their productions grew ever more elaborate. They now typically use European instruments, film extracts and recorded music.

In the past, both Hubert Ogunde and Ade Love produced soundtracks for their movies using very rich Yoruba language. Modern-day Yoruba film and theater music composers among whom Tope Alabi is the flagbearer have variously accompanied dramatic actions with original music.

=== Television and film scoring ===
Since the introduction of television in 1959, the growing television and film industries have sourced a large amount of their artists and musical structure from Nigeria's extensive indigenous theater, which, in turn, evolved from festivals and religious ceremonies. Early television dramas in this era utilized folklore and songs from popular indigenous genres such as Nigerian highlife, as well as indigenous languages including Igbo, Yoruba, and so on. With the advent of Nigeria's film industry, controversially referred to as Nollywood, in the early 1990s, many of these TV producers simultaneously worked in film production, spreading this technique of indigenous sourcing to film scoring. Following an era defined by influences from European and North American art, the Nigerian film industry evolved a unique method of film scoring called prefiguring.

Prefiguring, popularized by the famous Nigerian soundtrack producer Stanley Okorie, utilizes motifs and repetitive tunes to foreshadow dialogue and major plot events before they happen on screen. This novel film scoring technique unique to the Nigerian film industry draws upon the art of storytelling in indigenous communities of Nigeria, displaying qualities of the communities’ languages, songs, dances, and dramas.

== Children's music ==
Children in Nigeria have many of their own traditions, usually singing games. These are most often call-and-response type songs, using archaic language. There are other songs, such as among the Tarok people that are sexually explicit and obscene, and are only performed far away from the home. Children also use instruments such as un-pitched raft zithers (made from cornstalks) and drums made from tin cans, a pipe made from a pawpaw stem and a jaw harp made from a sorghum stalk. Among the Hausa, children play a unique instrument in which they beat rhythms on the inflated stomach of a live, irritated pufferfish.

== Traditional instruments ==
Although percussion instruments are omnipresent, Nigeria's traditional music uses a number of diverse instruments. Many, such as the xylophone, are an integral part of music across West Africa, while others are imports from the Muslims of the Maghreb, or from Southern or East Africa; other instruments have arrived from Europe or the Americas. Brass instruments and woodwinds were early imports that played a vital role in the development of Nigerian music, while the later importation of electric guitars spurred the popularisation of jùjú music.

=== Percussion ===
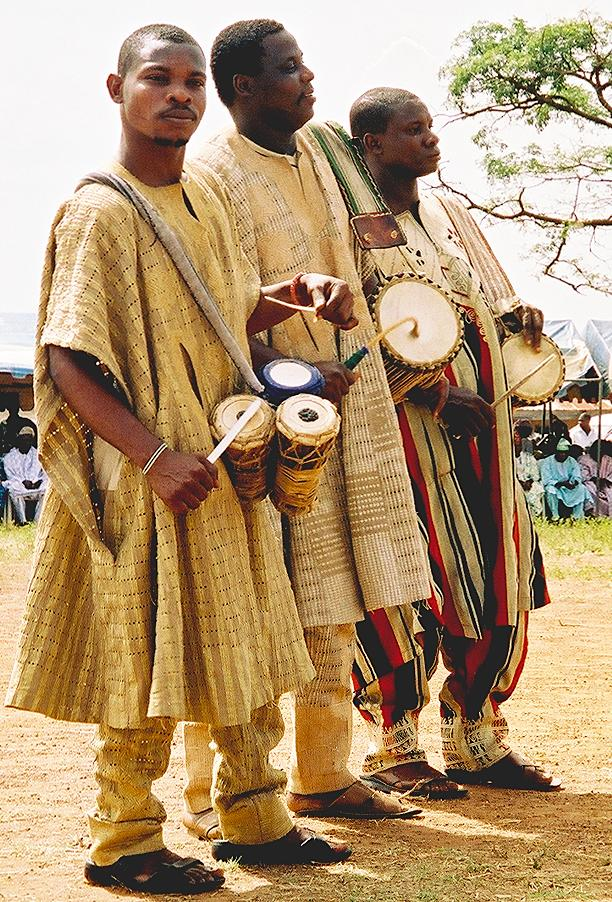
Drummers in Ojumo Oro, Kwara State

The xylophone is a tuned idiophone, common throughout west and central Africa. In Nigeria, they are most common in the southern part of the country, and are of the central African model. Several people sometimes simultaneously play a single xylophone. The instruments are usually made of loose wood placed across banana logs. Pit- and box-resonated xylophones are also found. Ensembles of clay pots beaten with a soft pad are common; they are sometimes filled with water. Although normally tuned, untuned examples are sometimes used to produce a bass rhythm. Hollow logs are also used, split lengthways, with resonator holes at the end of the slit. They were traditionally used to communicate over great distances.

Various bells are a common part of royal regalia, and were used in secret societies. They are usually made of iron, or in Islamic orchestras of the north, of bronze. Struck gourds, placed on a cloth and struck with sticks, are a part of women's music, as well as the bòòríí cult dances. Sometimes, especially in the north, gourds are placed upside-down in water, with the pitch adjusted by the amount of air underneath it. In the south-west, a number of tuned gourds are played while floating in a trough.

Scrapers are common throughout the south. One of the most common types is a notched stick, played by dragging a shell across the stick at various speeds. It is used both as a women's court instrument and by children in teasing games. Among the Yoruba, an iron rod may be used as a replacement for a stick. Rattles are common, made of gourds containing seeds or stones are common, as are net-rattles, in which a string network of beads or shells encloses a gourd. Rattles are typically played in ritual or religious context, predominantly by women.

Drums of many kinds are the most common type of percussion instrument in Nigeria. They are traditionally made from a single piece of wood or spherical calabashes, but have more recently been made from oil drums. The hourglass drum is the most common shape, although there are also double-headed barrel drums, single-headed drums and conical drums. Frame drums are also found in Nigeria, but may be an importation from Brazil. An unusual percussion instrument is the udu, a kind of vessel drum. This instrument is very essential in most African countries.

=== String instruments ===
The musical bow is found in Nigeria as a mouth-resonated cord, either plucked or struck. It is most common in the central part of the country, and is associated with agricultural songs and those expressing social concerns. Cereal stalks bound together and strings supported by two bridges are used to make a kind of raft zither, played with the thumbs, typically for solo entertainment. The arched harp is found in the eastern part of the country, especially among the Tarok. It usually has five or six strings and pentatonic tuning. A bowl-resonated spike-fiddle with a lizard skin table is used in the northern region, and is similar to central Asian and Ethiopian forms. The Hausa and Kanuri peoples play a variety of spike-lutes.

=== Other instruments ===
A variety of brass and woodwind instruments are also found in Nigeria. These include long trumpets, frequently made of aluminium and played in pairs or ensembles of up to six, often accompanied by a shawm. Wooden trumpets, gourd trumpets, end-blown flutes, cruciform whistles, transverse clarinets and various kinds of horns are also found.

== List of Nigerian musical genres ==
- Afro (african) Psychedelic Rock/Afro rock
  - Igbo funk
  - Igbo psychedelic rock
- Afrobeat
- Afrobeats
- Anioma highlife music
- Apala
- Aurrebbe music
- Edo highlife
- Egedege
- Ekpili
- Gospel
- Gyration music
- Igbo highlife
  - Ikwokirikwo, Owerri Bongo
- Igbo rap
- Ikorodo
- Ijaw highlife
- Ikwerre highlife music
- Jùjú
  - Afro-juju
- Odumodu music
- Ogene
- Rara music
- Waka music
- Were music
  - Fuji music
- Yo-pop

== Popular music ==
Many African countries have seen turbulence and violence during their forced transition from a diverse region of folk cultures to a group of modern nation states. Nigeria has experienced more difficulty than most African countries in forging a popular cultural identity from the diverse peoples of the countryside. From its beginnings in the streets of Lagos, popular music in Nigeria has long been an integral part of the field of African pop, bringing in influences and instruments from many ethnic groups to form Nigerian popular music.

The earliest styles of Nigerian popular music often referred to as Naija Music were palm-wine music and highlife, which spread in the 1920s among Nigeria and nearby countries of Liberia, Sierra Leone and Ghana. In Nigeria, juju music was created. During this time, a few other styles such as apala, derived from traditional Yoruba music, also found a more limited audience. By the 1960s, Cuban, American and other styles of imported music were enjoying a large following, and musicians started to incorporate these influences into jùjú; intermingling of Hausa populations with Middle Eastern communities in cities south of the country notably introduced them to Bollywood and its music. The result was a profusion of new styles in the last few decades of the 20th century, including waka music, Yo-pop and Afrobeat.

=== Palm-wine and the invention of jùjú ===
By the start of the 20th century, Yoruba music had incorporated brass instruments, written notation, Islamic percussion and new Brazilian techniques, resulting in the Lagos-born palm-wine style. The term palm-wine is also used to describe related genres in Sierra Leone, Liberia and Ghana. These varieties are better known than Nigerian palm-wine. However, palm-wine originally referred to a diverse set of styles played with string instruments, characteristically, guitars or banjos) with shakers and hand drums accompanying This urban style was frequently played in bars to accompany drinking (hence the name, which is derived from the alcoholic palm wine beverage).

The first stars of palm-wine had emerged by the 1920s, the most famous of whom was Baba Tunde King. King probably coined the word jùjú — a style of music he helped to create — in reference to the sound of a Brazilian tambourine; alternatively, the term may have developed as an expression of disdain by the colonial leaders (any native tradition was apt to be dismissed as 'mere joujou, French for "nonsense"). By the early 1930s, British record labels such as His Master's Voice had started to record palm-wine, and more celebrities emerged, including Ojoge Daniel, Tunde Nightingale and Speedy Araba. These artists, along with Tunde King, established the core of the style which was called jùjú, and remained one of the most popular genres in Nigeria throughout the 20th century. Some Jùjú musicians were itinerant, including early pioneers Ojoge Daniel, Irewole Denge and the "blind minstrel" Kokoro.

=== Apala ===
Apala is a style of vocal and percussive Muslim Yoruba music. It emerged in the late 1930s as a means of rousing worshippers after the fasting of Ramadan. Under the influence of popular Afro-Cuban percussion, apala developed into a more polished style and attracted a large audience. The music required two or three talking drums (omele), a rattle (sekere), thumb piano (agidigbo) and a bell (agogo). Haruna Ishola was the most famous apala performer, and he later played an integral role in bringing apala to larger audiences as a part of fuji music.

=== The 1950s, '60s and '70s ===
Following World War II, Nigerian music started to take on new instruments and techniques, including electric instruments imported from the United States and Europe. Rock N' roll, soul, and later funk, became very popular in Nigeria, and elements of these genres were added to jùjú by artists such as I. K. Dairo. Meanwhile, highlife had been slowly gaining in popularity among the Igbo people, and their unique style soon found a national audience. At the same time, apala's Haruna Ishola was becoming one of the country's biggest stars. In the early to mid-1970s, three of the biggest names in Nigerian music history were at their peak: Fela Kuti, Ebenezer Obey and King Sunny Adé, while the end of that decade saw the start of Yo-pop and Nigerian reggae.

Although popular styles such as highlife and jùjú were at the top of the Nigerian charts in the '60s, traditional music remained widespread. Traditional stars included the Hausa Dan Maraya, who was so well known that he was brought to the battlefield during the 1967 Nigerian Civil War to lift the morale of the federal troops.

==== Modernisation of Jùjú ====
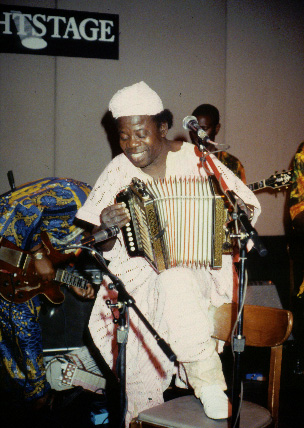
I.K. Dairo

Following World War II, Tunde Nightingale's s'o wa mbe style made him one of the first jùjú stars, and he introduced more Westernised pop influences to the genre. During the 1950s, recording technology grew more advanced, and the gangan talking drum, electric guitar and accordion were incorporated into jùjú. Much of this innovation was the work of IK Dairo & the Morning Star Orchestra (later IK Dairo & the Blue Spots), which formed in 1957. These performers brought jùjú from the rural poor to the urban cities of Nigeria and beyond. Dairo became perhaps the biggest star of African music by the '60s, recording numerous hit songs that spread his fame to as far away as Japan. In 1963, he became the only African musician ever honoured by receiving membership in the Order of the British Empire, an order of chivalry in the United Kingdom.

==== Dispersion of highlife ====
Among the Igbo people, Ghanaian highlife became popular in the early 1950s, and other guitar-band styles from Cameroon and Zaire soon followed. The Ghanaian E. T. Mensah, easily the most popular highlife performer of the 1950s, toured Igbo-land frequently, drawing huge crowds of devoted fans. Bobby Benson & His Combo was the first Nigerian highlife band to find audiences across the country. Benson was followed by Jim Lawson & the Mayor's Dance Band, who achieved national fame in the mid-'70s, ending with Lawson's death in 1971. During the same period, other highlife performers were reaching their peak. These included Prince Nico Mbarga and his band Rocafil Jazz, whose "Sweet Mother" was a pan-African hit that sold more than 13 million copies, more than any other African single of any kind. Mbarga used English lyrics in a style that he dubbed panko, which incorporated "sophisticated rumba guitar-phrasing into the highlife idiom".

After the civil war in the 1960s, Igbo musicians were forced out of Lagos and returned to their homeland. The result was that highlife ceased to be a major part of mainstream Nigerian music, and was thought of as being something purely associated with the Igbos of the east. Highlife's popularity slowly dwindled among the Igbos, supplanted by jùjú and fuji. However, a few performers kept the style alive, such as Yoruba singer and trumpeter Victor Olaiya (the only Nigerian to ever earn a platinum record), Stephen Osita Osadebe, Oliver De Coque, Celestine Ukwu, Oriental Brothers, Sonny Okosun, Victor Uwaifo, and Orlando "Dr. Ganja" Owoh, whose distinctive toye style fused jùjú and highlife.

==== Birth of fuji ====
Apala, a traditional style from Ogun state, one of the Yoruba states in Nigeria, became very popular in the 1960s, led by performers including Haruna Ishola, Sefiu Ayan, Kasumu Adio, and Ayinla Omowura. Ishola, who was one of Nigeria's most consistent hit makers between 1955 and his death in 1983, recorded apala songs, which alternated between slow and emotional, and swift and energetic. His lyrics were a mixture of improvised praise and passages from the Quran, as well as traditional proverbs. His work became a formative influence on the developing fuji style.

The late 1960s saw the appearance of the first fuji bands. Fuji was named after Mount Fuji in Japan, purely for the sound of the word, according to Ayinde Barrister. Fuji was a synthesis of apala with the "ornamented, free-rhythmic" vocals of ajisari devotional musicians and was accompanied by the sakara, a tambourine-drum, and Hawaiian guitar. Among the genre's earliest stars were Haruna Ishola and Ayinla Omowura; Ishola released numerous hits from the late '50s to the early '80s, becoming one of the country's most famous performers. Fuji grew steadily more popular between the 1960s and '70s, becoming closely associated with Islam in the process.

Fuji has been described as jùjú without guitars; ironically, Ebenezer Obey once described jùjú as mambo with guitars. However, at its roots, fuji is a mixture of Muslim traditional were music' ajisari songs with "aspects of apala percussion and vocal songs and brooding, philosophical sakara music"; Of these elements, apala is the fundamental basis of fuji The first stars of fuji were the rival bandleaders Alhaji Sikiru Ayinde Barrister and Ayinla Kollington Alhaji Sikiru Ayinde Barrister started his fuji career in the early 1970s with the Golden Fuji Group, although he had sung Muslim songs since he was 10 years old. He first changed his group's name to "Fuji Londoners" when he came back from a trip to London, England. After a very long time — with hits such as "Orilonise", "Fuji Disco/Iku Baba Obey", "Oke Agba", "Aye", and "Suuru" — he changed the group's name to "Supreme Fuji Commanders". Ayinde's rival was Ayinla Kollington or "Baba Alatika", known for fast tempo and dance-able brand of fuji, who also recorded hit albums like "ko bo simi lo'run mo e, in the '80s he released "ijo yoyo, Lakukulala and American megastar" to mention few of his successful albums. With all due respect Ayinla Kollington is a coherent social commentator. He was followed in the 1980s by burgeoning stars such as Wasiu Ayinde Marshall.

==== Sunny Ade and Obey ====
Ebenezer Obey formed the International Brothers in 1964, and his band soon rivalled that of IK Dairo as the biggest Nigerian group. They played a form of bluesy, guitar-based and highlife-influenced jùjú that included complex talking drum-dominated percussion elements. Obey's lyrics addressed issues that appealed to urban listeners, and incorporated Yoruba traditions and his conservative Christian faith. His rival was King Sunny Adé, who emerged in the same period, forming the Green Spots in 1966 and then achieving some major hits with the African Beats after 1974's Esu Biri Ebo Mi. Ade and Obey raced to incorporate new influences into jùjú music and to gather new fans; Hawaiian slack-key, keyboards and background vocals were among the innovations added during this rapidly changing period. Ade added strong elements of Jamaican dub music, and introduced the practice of having the guitar play the rhythm and the drums play the melody. During this period, jùjú songs changed from short pop songs to long tracks, often over 20 minutes in length. Bands increased from four performers in the original ensembles, to 10 with IK Dairo and more than 30 with Obey and Ade.

=== 1980s and 1990s ===
In the early 1980s, both Obey and Ade found larger audiences outside of Nigeria. In 1982, Ade was signed to Island Records, who hoped to replicate Bob Marley's success, and released Juju Music, which sold far beyond expectations in Europe and the United States. Obey released Current Affairs in 1980 on Virgin Records and became a brief star in the UK, but was not able to sustain his international career as long as Ade. Ade led a brief period of international fame for jùjú, which ended in 1985 when he lost his record contract after the commercial failure of Aura (recorded with Stevie Wonder) and his band walked out in the middle of a huge Japanese tour. Ade's brush with international renown brought a lot of attention from mainstream record companies, and helped to inspire the burgeoning world music industry. By the end of the 1980s, jùjú had lost out to other styles, like Yo-pop, gospel and reggae. In the 1990s, however, fuji and jùjú remained popular, as did waka music and Nigerian reggae. At the very end of the decade, hip hop music spread to the country after being a major part of music in neighboring regions like Senegal.

==== Yo-pop and Afro-jùjú (1980s) ====
Two of the biggest stars of the '80s were Segun Adewale and Shina Peters, who started their careers performing in the mid-'70s with Prince Adekunle. They eventually left Adekunle and formed a brief partnership as Shina Adewale & the International Superstars before beginning solo careers. Adewale was the first of the two to gain success, when he became the most famous performer of Yo-pop.

The Yo-pop craze did not last for long, replaced by Shina Peters' Afro-juju style, which broke into the mainstream after the release of Afro-Juju Series 1 (1989). Afro-juju was a combination of Afrobeat and fuji, and it ignited such fervor among Shina's fans that the phenomenon was dubbed "Shinamania". Though he was awarded Juju Musician of the Year in 1990, Shina's follow-up, Shinamania sold respectively but was panned by critics. His success opened up the field to newcomers, however, leading to the success of Fabulous Olu Fajemirokun and Adewale Ayuba. The same period saw the rise of new styles like the funky juju pioneered by Dele Taiwo.

==== Afrobeat ====
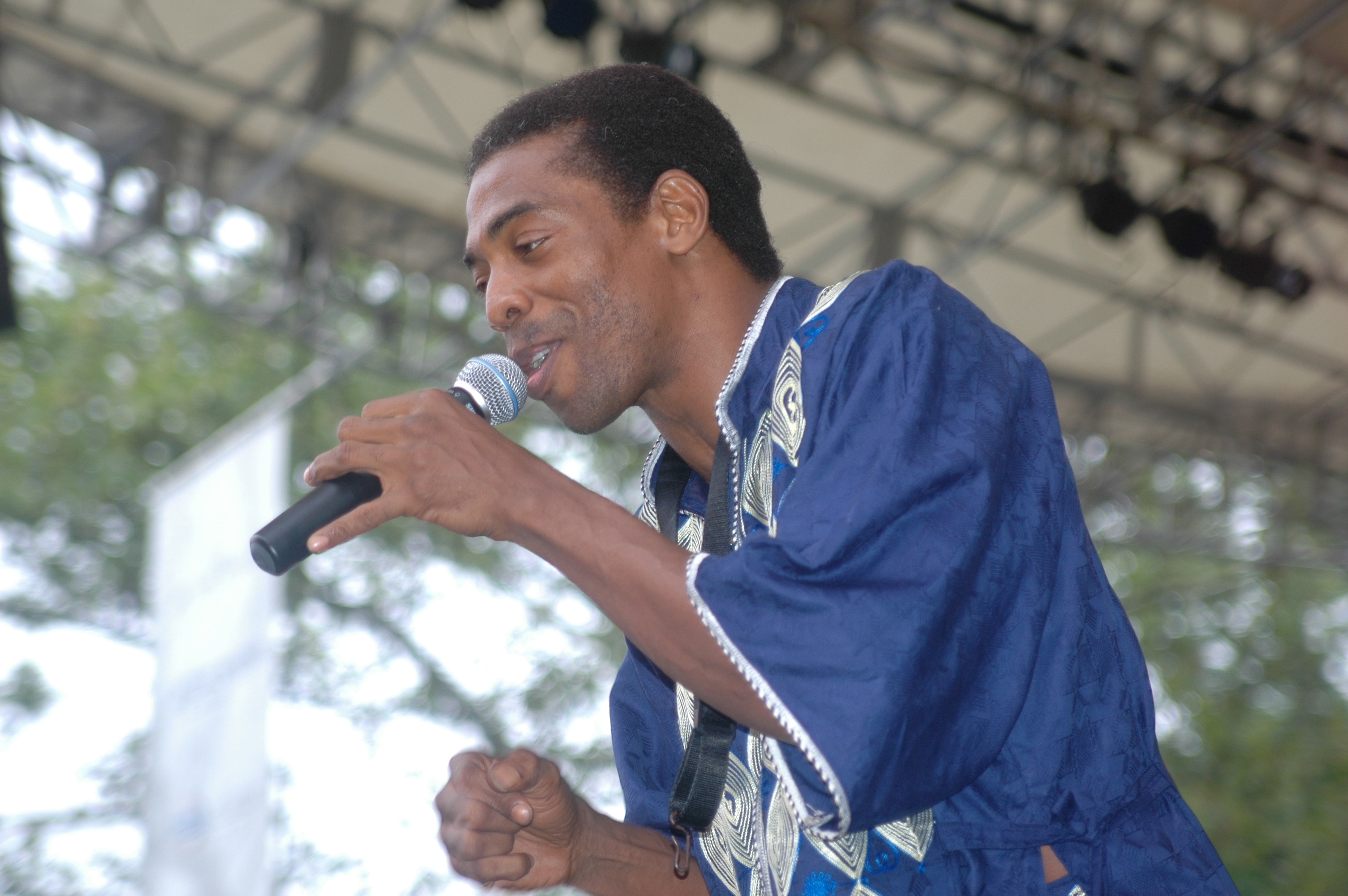
Femi Kuti

Afrobeat is a style most closely associated with Nigeria, and Afrobeat recordings are a prominent part of the world music category found throughout the developed world. It is music with elements of Fuji, juju, jazz and other music genres. The most popular and well-known performer, indeed the most famous Nigerian musician in history, is undoubtedly Fela Kuti. Although Kuti is often credited as the only pioneer of Afrobeat, other musicians such as Orlando Julius Ekemode were also prominent in the early Afrobeat scene, where they combined highlife, jazz and funk. A brief period in the United States saw him exposed to the Black Power movement and the Black Panthers, an influence that he would come to express in his lyrics. After living in London briefly, he moved back to Lagos and opened a club, The Shrine, which was one of the most popular music spots in the city. He started recording with Africa '70, a huge band featuring drummer Tony Allen, who has since gone on to become a well-known musician in his own right. With Africa 70, Kuti recorded a series of hits, earning the ire of the government as he tackled such diverse issues as poverty, traffic and skin-bleaching. In 1985, Kuti was jailed for five years, but was released after only two years after international outcry and massive domestic protests. Upon release, Kuti continued to criticise the government in his songs, and became known for eccentric behaviour, such as suddenly divorcing all twenty-eight wives because "no man has the right to own a woman's vagina". His death from AIDS in 1997 sparked a period of national mourning that was unprecedented in documented Nigerian history.

In the 1980s, Afrobeat became affiliated with the burgeoning genre of world music. In Europe and North America, so-called "world music" acts came from all over the world and played in a multitude of styles. Fela Kuti and his Afrobeat followers were among the most famous musicians considered world music.

From the 1980s to' the 1990s, Afrobeat had diversified by taking in new influences from US funk and hip hop. The ever-masked and enigmatic Lágbájá became one of the standard-bearers of the new wave of Afrobeat, especially after his 1996 LP C'est Une African Thing. Following a surprise appearance in place of his father, Fela, Femi Kuti garnered a large fan base that enabled him to tour across Europe. Femi Kuti and Seun Kuti followed their father Fela Kuti.

==== Waka ====
The popular singer Salawa Abeni had become nationally renowned after the release of Late General Murtala Ramat Mohammed in 1976, which was the first Nigerian recording by a woman to sell more than a million copies. In the 1980s, she remained one of the nation's best-selling artists, creating her own unique variety of music called waka; she was so closely associated with the genre that a royal figure, the Alaafin of Oyo, Oba Lamidi Adeyemi, crowned her the "Queen of Waka Music" in 1992. Waka was a fusion of jùjú, fuji and traditional Yoruba music.

==== Reggae and hip hop ====
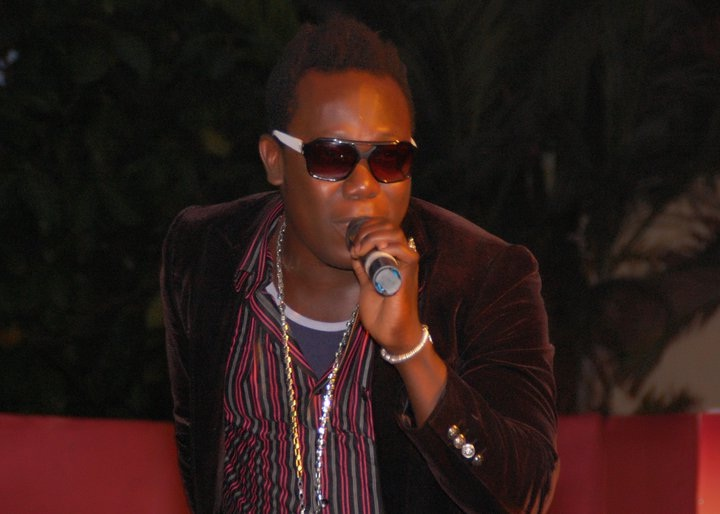
Duncan Mighty performing

When talking about reggae music in Nigeria, this brand of music was started by a musician simply called "Terakota". By the 80s, Nigerian reggae stars included Daniel Wilson, The Mandators, Ras Kimono, Majek Fashek, whose 1988 cover of Bob Marley's "Redemption Song", became an unprecedented success for reggae in Nigeria. Like many later Nigerian reggae stars, Fashek was a part of the long-running band The Mandators, who toured and recorded incessantly during the mid to late 1980s and early '90s. Later prominent reggae musicians included Jerri Jheto and Daddy Showkey.

African Caribbean fusion is a genre that has been popular and growing over the years, especially in the 21st century. In this genre of music African musicians incorporate Jamaican patois into their lyrics and beats. Although, very popular in Jamaica, this genre well blended genre became well known in the African region around the 19th century because of the Nigerian Reggae musician Majek Fashek who attracted international attention to this fusion. This genre of music is gaining more presence in Nigeria with recent 21st-century artists such as Duncan Mighty, Timaya, Slim Burna, Orezi, Burna Boy and Patoranking, attracting a younger audience.

Hip hop music was brought to Nigeria in the late 1980s, and grew steadily popular throughout the first part of the 1990s. The first acts included Sound on Sound, Emphasis, Ruff Rugged & Raw, SWAT ROOT, De Weez and Black Masquradaz. Moreover, mainstream success grew later in the decade, with attention brought by early hits like The Trybesmen's "Trybal Marks" (1999) and the trio The Remedies' "Judile" and "Sakoma". One of The Remedies, Tony Tetuila, went on to work with the Plantashun Boiz to great commercial acclaim. The 1999 founding of Paybacktyme Records by Solomon Dare, popularly known as Solodee, Kennis Music by Kenny Ogungbe, Dove Records by Nelson Brown, and Trybe Records by eLDee helped redefined and establish a Nigerian hip-hop scene. Also, the general rapid growth of the entertainment scene with support from the media helped popularise hip hop music in Nigeria. Television Programmes like Videowheels, HipTV, Music Africa, the MTN Y'ello show, Music Africa, Nigezie, and Soundcity played a major role. Other prominent Nigerian hip-hop musicians include Tuface idibia, Vector, Reminisce, Ice Prince, M.I Abaga, Ruggedman, Eedris Abdulkareem, Erigga, Weird MC, Naeto C, Twin-X, and P-Square

Around the close of 2012 hip-hop movement began to lose its popularity in Nigeria. Afrobeats artists began to rule the game notable acts such as

Artists including Wizkid, Davido, Olamide, Burna Boy, Rema, CKay, Fireboy DML, Kiss Daniel, Tekno, Mc Galaxy, Adekunle Gold, Dammy Krane, andLil Kesh have received attention for their music over the years.

As of 2023, a new generation of hip hop artists have continued to sustain the genre’s presence in Nigeria despite the dominance of Afrobeats. Artists such as PsychoYP became associated with the country’s growing drill movement, while Blue Ivan gained recognition for blending trap and psychedelic pop influences into contemporary Nigerian hip hop.

The evolution of Nigerian drill music, particularly within Abuja, was later documented by The Native as part of the wider development of drill culture in the country. The publication referenced King Perryy and PsychoYP’s song “YKTFV (You Know The Fvcking Vibes)” as one of the records that contributed to the growing popularity of drill-inspired music in Nigeria.

== Afrobeats: international breakthrough ==
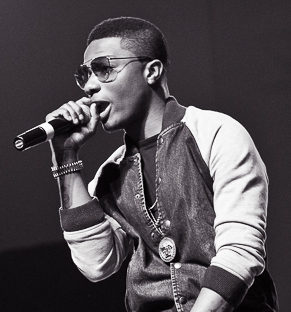
Wizkid

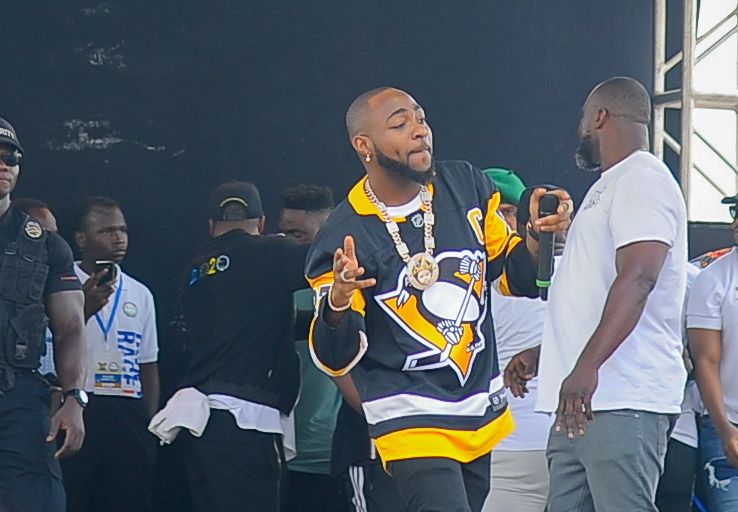
Davido

Unlike Afrobeat, Afrobeats has seen global success since 2018. Nigerian artists are the main contributors to this.

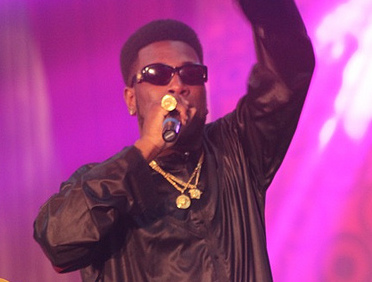
Burna Boy

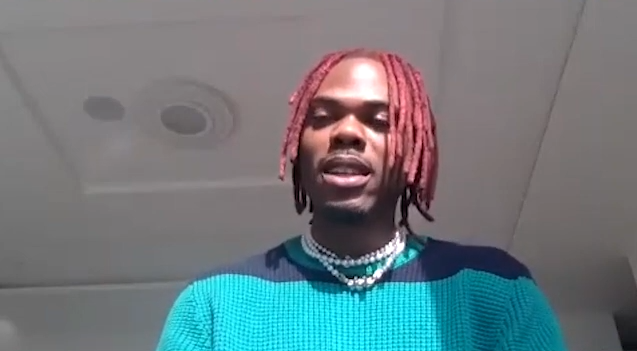
CKay

According to Billboard Magazine, Nigeria's Afrobeats is the fastest-growing genre in the United States and in the United Kingdom as of 2023. Afrobeats star CKay said, "Afrobeats is the new pop."

=== Firm fixture at awards ceremonies ===
Nigerian musicians are increasingly receiving international recognition.

Artists such as King Sunny Ade, Femi Kuti and Seun Kuti have received Grammy nominations in the past.

Burna Boy's African Giant received a Grammy Awards nomination in 2020 for Best World Music Album. His Twice as Tall received a Grammy for Best Global Music Album the following year. Wizkid's Made in Lagos was nominated in the same category in 2021. Wizkids Essence featuring Tems was also nominated in the Best Global Music Performance category.

The collaboration of Afrobeats artists with the world's biggest music stars has led to further global exposure. In 2019, US star Beyoncé enlisted the services of numerous Nigerian stars, including Wizkid and Burna Boy. Her "Brown Skin Girl" won Best Music Video at the 2021 Grammys. Angélique Kidjo's album Mother Nature (2021), featuring many Nigerian stars, was nominated for the Best Global Music Album award.

The success of Nigerian Afrobeats led to the introduction of the Best African Act category at the MTV Europe Music Awards in 2005, followed by the BET Awards in 2011, which have since awarded prizes in the Best International Act: Africa category.

=== Chart positions ===
In 2012, D'banj's "Oliver Twist" reached number 9 on the UK Singles Chart and number 2 on the UK R&B Chart. It was the first Nigerian Afrobeats song to achieve this.

In April 2012, P-Square remixed their 2009 hit single 'E No Easy' with Matt Houston, and it became the first Nigerian afrobeats song to reach top 5 on SNEP - French Official chart and top 10 on Ultratop- Belgium official, spending 29 weeks and 16 weeks respectively. The song was the First Afrobeats Summer hit in France, which in turn boosted afrobeats visibility in the francophone countries in Europe.

Wizkid's "Essence", featuring Tems, entered the top ten of the US Billboard 100 as a remix with Justin Bieber.

=== Sold-out arenas ===
Nigerian pop musicians such as Wizkid, Davido and Burna Boy have sold out the O2 Arena in London and the Accor Arena in Paris respectively.

== Women in music ==
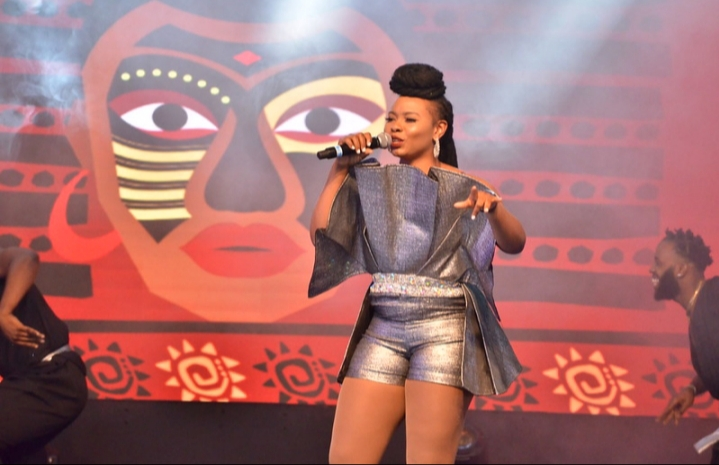
Yemi Alade

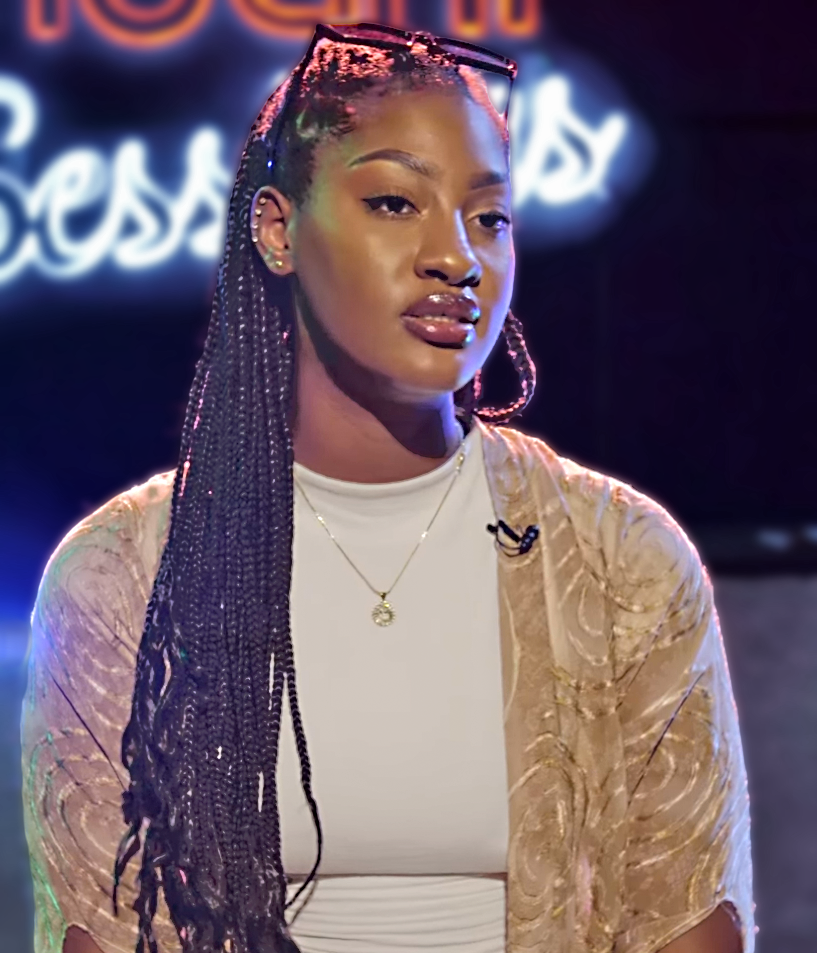
Tems

In the Nigerian music industry female artists stand out and are widely recognized for their talents and achievements. Over the years, most Nigerian female artists stuck to contemporary African music, but in the 21st century, several female artists began to diversify into other genres including rap, hip-hop and Afrobeat. Notable female Nigerian rappers include Weird Mc, Sasha P, Mo'Cheddah and Eva Alordiah. While there are many female Afrobeats artists, only a few have been constant over the years like Aṣa Omawumi Megbele, Seyi Shay, Niniola, Tiwa Savage, Teni, Yemi Alade and Simi. The 2020s saw a surge in the presence of women in Nigerian music with artistes like Tems and Ayra Starr gaining international accolades and recognition.

== Music at festivals and holidays ==
Durbar festivals are held in many parts of North-west Nigeria; durbar is meant to honour the Emir during the culmination of the Islamic festivals Eid ul-Fitr, Eid ul-Adha, and Sallah for the well-known Katsina durbar, and is sometimes also used to honour visiting dignitaries . Although the principal attraction of the durbar festivals is displays of traditional horsemanship, performances by drummers, trumpeters and praise-singers are an important part of the celebration Other holidays in which music plays an important role include drumming and dances performed at Christmas, Easter Sunday and Easter Monday.

== Classical music ==
In the 20th century, Nigeria produced a number of classical composers; these include Samuel Akpabot (1932-2000), Ayo Bankole (1935-1976), Lazarus Ekwueme, Akin Euba (1935-2020), Fela Sowande (1905-1987) and Joshua Uzoigwe (1946-2005). Sowande was one of the first and most famous African composers in the Western classical tradition, and founder of the Nigerian art music tradition. Sowande was also an organist and jazz musician, incorporating these and elements of Nigerian folk music into his work. Echezonachukwu Nduka, a Nigerian concert pianist and poet, specializes in the performance and recording of piano music by Nigerian composers and by extension, African composers working within the genre of African Pianism.

== See also ==
- Country music in Nigeria
