= List of juju musicians =

This is a List of notable juju musicians in Nigeria.

There are numerous genres of music in Nigeria. Some genres such as Jùjú music, Fuji music, Apala and Were music are peculiar to certain ethnic groups.

== A ==
- Adeolu Akinsanya
- Ayinde Bakare

== D ==
- Dele Ojo
- Dayo Kujure
- Dele Taiwo
- Dele Abiodun, Admiral

== E ==
- Ebenezer Obey

== I ==
- I. K. Dairo

== K ==
- Kokoro
- King Sunny Adé
- Kayode Fashola

== M ==
- Moses Olaiya (Baba Sala)

== P ==
- Prince Adekunle

== S ==
- Segun Adewale
- Shina Peters
- Sonny Okosun
- Sunny Melody

== T ==
- Tunde King
- Tunde Nightingale

== See also ==
- List of Nigerian highlife musicians
