= Yoruba music =

Music of the Yoruba people of Nigeria, Togo, and Benin

Yoruba music is the pattern/style of music practiced by the Yoruba people of Nigeria, Togo, and Benin. It is perhaps best known for its extremely advanced drumming tradition and techniques, especially using the gongon hourglass shape tension drums. Yoruba folk music became perhaps the most prominent kind of West African music in Afro-Latin and Caribbean musical styles; it left an especially important influence on the music used in Santería practice and the music of Cuba.

The Yoruba people of south-western Nigeria are also one of the most socially diverse groups on the African continent. A major feature that sets them apart from other groups in Nigeria is their accomplishment in the arts and entertainment industry, especially in music. Jùjú, fùjì, àpàlà and sákárà music are among the popular genres of music that originated among the Yoruba people. How and when these forms of music emerged in the Nigerian music scene has remained a puzzle to historians. However, it is generally believed that these genres of music originated from popular folk music among the Yoruba people during the colonial era and gradually grew to become popular forms of music in the country after independence in 1960. This paper traces the origin and the significance of Yoruba traditional music in Nigeria as well as its roles in popularising the cultural values and heritage of the Yoruba people at home and in the diaspora. It is argued that music constitutes an important medium through which Yoruba values have been sustained in society in the face of the aggressive cultural imperialism that is fast encroaching the African continent. For a comprehensive discussion of Yoruba music, see Bode Omojola's book, Yoruba Music in the Twentieth Century (University of Rochester Press, 2012).

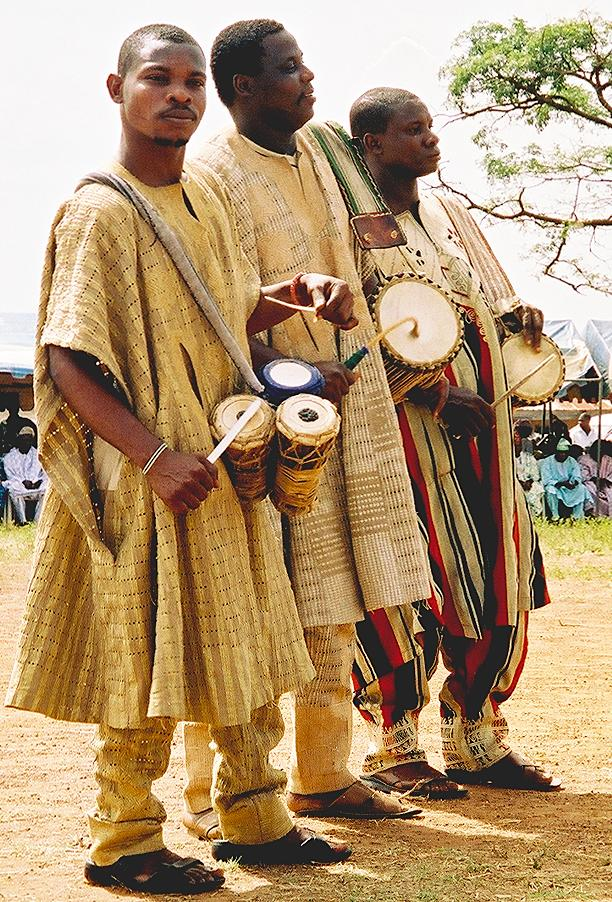
Omele ako, batá and two dunduns. Yoruba drummers in Kwara state.

== Folk music ==
Ensembles using the dundun play a type of music that is also called dundun. These ensembles consist of various sizes of tension drums along with special band drums (ogido). The gangan is another such. The leader of a dundun ensemble is the oniyalu who uses the drum to "talk" by imitating the tonality of Yoruba. Much of Yoruba music is spiritual in nature, and this form is often devoted to Orisas.

=== Rhythmic structure ===
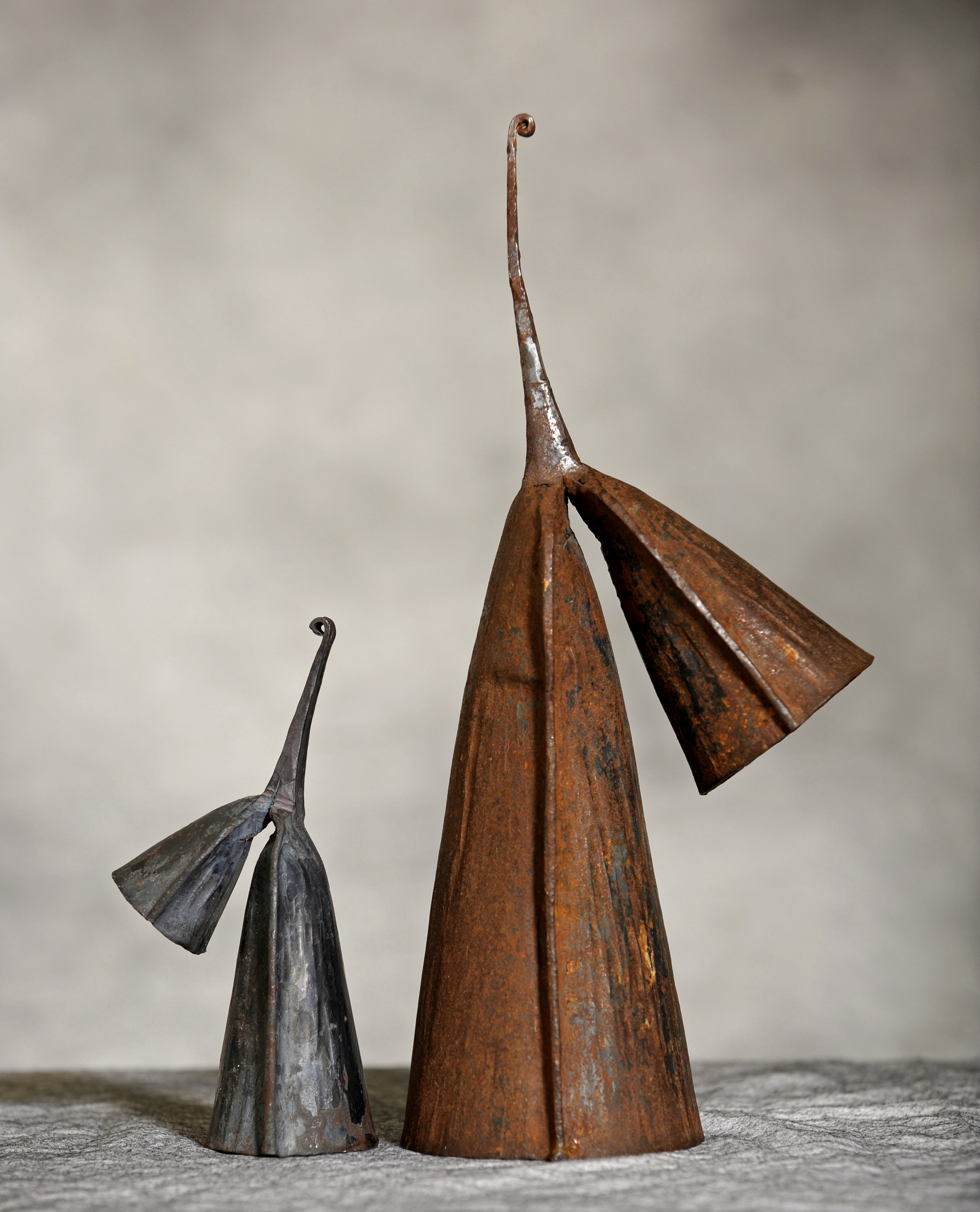
Iron agogô bells.

The most commonly used key pattern, or guide pattern in traditional Yoruba drumming is the seven-stroke figure known in ethnomusicology as the standard pattern. The standard pattern is expressed in both a triple-pulse (12/8 or 6/8) and a duple-pulse (4/4 or 2/2) structure. The standard pattern is often sounded on an iron bell.

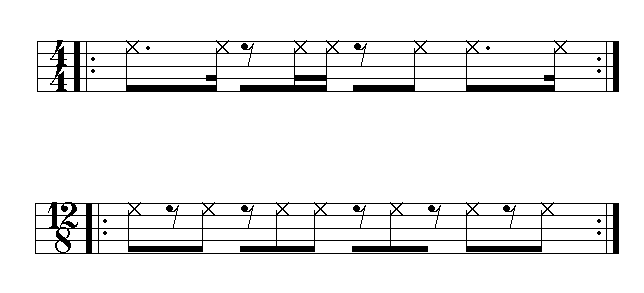
Standard pattern in duple-pulse (4/4) and triple-pulse (12/8) form.,, and for comparison.

The strokes of the standard pattern coincide with: 1, 1a, 2& 2a, 3&, 4, 4a.

12/8:

1 & a 2 & a 3 & a 4 & a ||
X . X . X X . X . X . X ||

4/4:

1 e & a 2 e & a 3 e & a 4 e & a ||
X . . X . . X X . . X . X . . X ||

A great deal of Yoruba drum music is based in cross rhythm. The following example shows the five-stroke form of the standard pattern (known as clave in Afro-Latin music) on the kagano dundun drum (top line). The dunduns on the second and third lines sound an embellishment of the three-over-four (3:4) cross-rhythm—expressed as three pairs of strokes against four pairs of strokes.

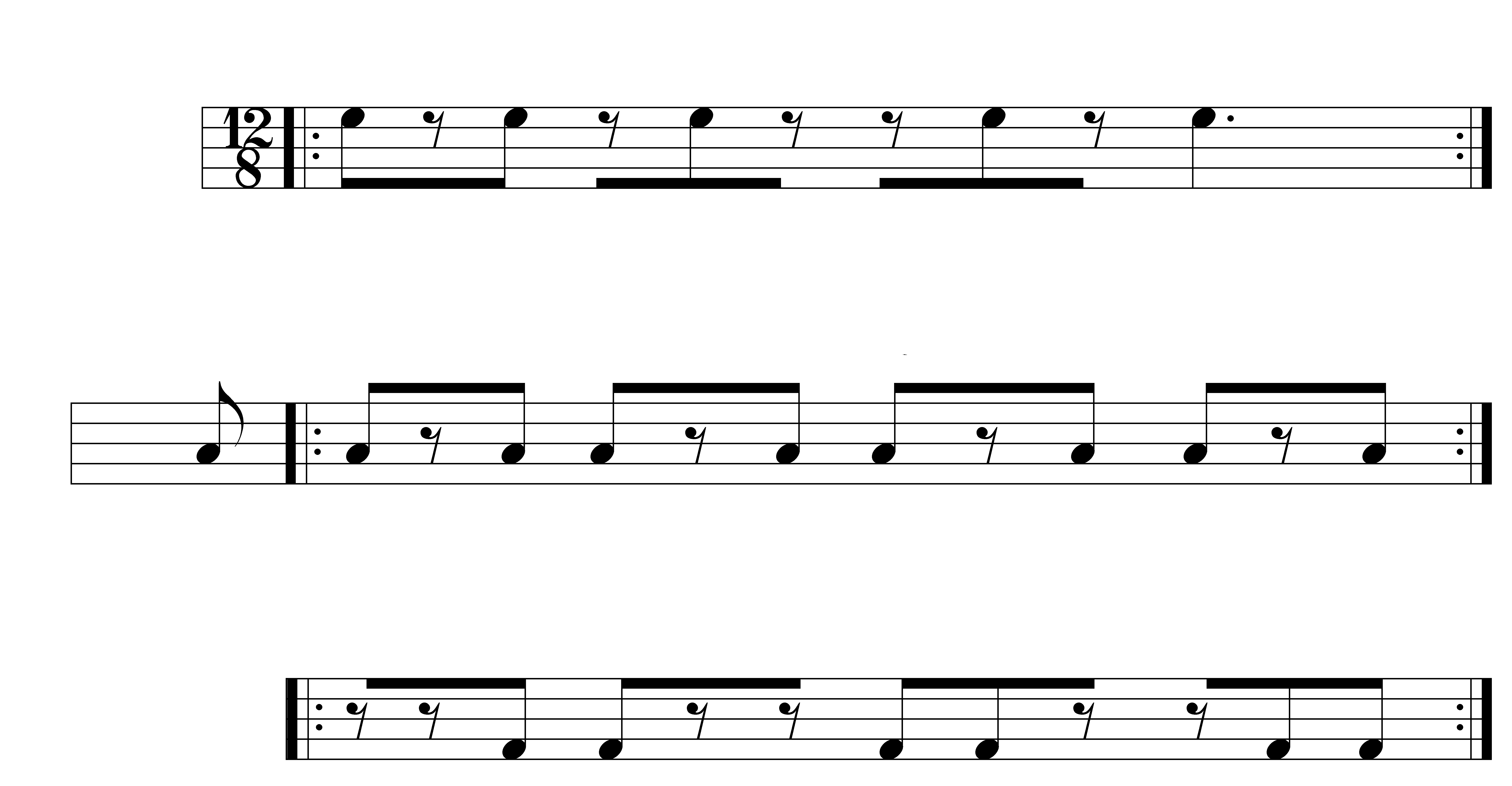
Yoruba dundun ensemble.

== Popular music ==
Yorùbá music is a huge part of Nigeria’s popular music today. While the old traditional style stayed original, modern Yorùbá music has changed over time by mixing in foreign instruments and new creative ideas from around the world.This means playing African music—specifically Yorùbá music—using a mix of instruments from all over the world.

Yoruba music traditionally centred on folklore and spiritual/deity worship, utilising basic and natural instruments such as clapping of the hands. Alagbe identifies a praise singer often from a family entrusted with sacred music, praise chanting, and ceremonial mediation. Although, it is true that music genres like the highlife played by musicians like Rex Lawson, Ebenezer Obey Segun Bucknor, Bobby Benson, etc., Fela Kuti's Afrobeat and King Sunny Adé's jùjú are all Yoruba adaptations of foreign music. These musical genres have their roots in large metropolitan cities like Lagos, Ibadan, and Port Harcourt where people and culture mix influenced by their rich culture.

Many famous artists helped start Jùjú music, such as Tunde King, Tunde Nightingale, Why Worry in Ondo, Ayinde Bakare, Dr. Orlando Owoh, Dele Ojo, IK Dairo, and Moses Olaiya (Baba Sala). At the same time, Sakara music was led by early players like Ojo Olawale in Ibadan, Abibu Oluwa, Yusuf Olatunji, Sanusi Aka, and Saka Layigbade. Apala is another modern Yoruba style made popular by energetic leaders like Haruna Ishola, Sefiu Ayan, Ligali Mukaiba, Kasumu Adio, and Yekini (Y.K.) Ajadi. Fuji music began in the late 60s and early 70s; it grew out of the "were" and "ajisari" styles and was made famous by Ibadan singers like Sikiru Ayinde Barrister, Alhaji Dauda Epo-Akara, and Ganiyu Kuti (Gani Irefin). Waka music is also very popular, thanks to Alhaja Batile Alake and others like Salawa Abeni, Kuburat Alaragbo, Asanat Omo-Aje, Mujidat Ogunfalu, Misitura Akawe, Fatimo Akingbade, Karimot Aduke, and Risikat Abeawo. In the big cities of Ibadan and Lagos, all these different styles came together to create the start of Nigerian popular music.

== Musical instruments ==
- Agbe: a shaker
- Ashiko: a cone-shaped drum
- Batá drum: a well decorated traditional drum of many tones, with strong links to the deity Shango, it produces sharp high tone sounds.
- Goje: sort of violin like the sahelian kora
- Sekere: a melodic shaker; beads or cowrie shells beautifully wound around a gourd, shaken, beaten by fists occasionally and thrown in the air to create a festive mood.
- gudugudu: a smaller, melodic bata
- Sakara drum: goatskin istretched over clay ring
- Agogô: a high-pitched tone instrument like a "covered" 3-dimensional "tuning fork"
- Saworo: like agogo, but its tone is low-pitched
- aro: much like a saworo, low-pitched
- Seli: a combination of aro, saworo and hand-clapping
- Agidigbo, a thumb piano instrument wound round the neck and stabilized by the player's chest.
- Dundun, consisting of iya ilu or gbedu, main or "mother" drum and omele, smaller drums, played as an accompaniment to bata drums to create a base for their sharp beats.
- Bembé, bass drum, kettle drum. (see also List of Caribbean membranophones)
- Gangan: a talking drum, has two face and use in prosody if human speech
- Omele Ako Bata: known as omele meta and is a smallest drums in bata family

Ahmad Audi Adamu

== See also ==
- List of Nigerian highlife musicians
- Owanbe
