= Money dance =

Event at some wedding receptions in various cultures

The money dance, dollar dance, and apron dance are wedding traditions found in multiple cultures where guests give money to the newlyweds during the reception celebration. The specific practices vary significantly across cultures, ranging from guests paying to dance briefly with the bride or groom, to showering the couple with cash, to pinning banknotes on the couple's clothing. These traditions serve as a way for guests to show support for the marriage, provide financial assistance to help the couple start their new life together, and symbolize wishes for future prosperity.

== Europe ==
=== Poland ===
The money dance may have originated in Poland around the beginning of the 20th century. The dance takes place some time after the first dance, often once guests have had a chance to have a few drinks. The best man or MC or the disc jockey announces the event. Customarily, the best man begins dancing with the bride, pinning money onto her wedding gown or putting it into a purse, which she carries especially for the purpose, or into the pockets of an apron she dons over her gown, especially for this dance. In a more contemporary version of this custom, the dance includes bridesmaids and other ladies who dance. Ethnographic research in Poland also records wedding customs in which guests paid or gave money for the opportunity to dance with the bride.

=== Ukraine ===
At Ukrainian weddings, the father of the bride usually begins pinning money on her dress. He is followed by the best man and groomsmen, and, finally, by the remainder of the male guests. Another variation is where the bride's veil is removed and given to the maid of honor and an apron is placed on the bride. Money is then placed into her apron during the dance.

=== Balkan ===
In Balkan (Albania, Bosnia, Serbia, etc...) weddings, close relatives throw and shower money on the couple while they’re dancing.

=== Hungary ===
At Hungarian weddings, the bride takes off her shoes and puts them in the middle of the dance floor. Then her shoes are passed around from guest to guest and each deposits a contribution.

== Africa ==
=== Nigeria ===
In Nigeria, particularly among the Yoruba people, the tradition is known as money spraying and involves guests throwing naira notes at celebrants during weddings and other social events. This practice originated in the 1940s when families would discreetly place money in a groom's pocket to assist newlyweds with expenses.

During Nigeria's oil boom in the 1960s and 1970s, the practice evolved into a public display of throwing crisp naira notes at dancing celebrants, symbolizing wealth, status, and generosity. The practice is tied to Yoruba culture's Owanbe (lavish parties) and Juju music traditions, where guests shower musicians and praise singers with cash as appreciation.

Guests typically toss money in the air, place it on the celebrant's forehead, or pin it to their clothing during events like a wedding's first dance. The cash is collected by designated assistants and helps cover event costs or supports the couple's future endeavors. Despite its cultural significance, money spraying faces legal challenges under Nigerian currency abuse laws, leading to various enforcement actions by authorities.

== North America ==
=== Mexico ===
Relatives take turns dancing up to the bride and groom and pinning money on their clothes, which allows the couple to spend a few moments with each of their guests. After the money dance, the groom is ridiculed by his friends, tossed in the air while being covered with the veil, and given an apron and broom.

=== United States and Canada ===
In United States and Canada (including Puerto Rico), the practice of a money dance varies by geographic region and ethnic background of the families involved. It typically involves guests giving small sums of cash to the bride or pinning cash to her gown or veil. Alternatively, guests would line up to pay to kiss the bride, however this tradition has fallen out of practice in recent years. Sometimes the money is placed in an apron or pouch held by the maid of honor or a female relative, and the best man gives shots of whiskey to participants before the dance.

Some consider this a way for the bride and groom to have face time with their guests and to wish them luck. Any guest has the opportunity to dance with the bride or groom for 30–60 seconds. Sometimes couples keep the money outright, while some may save it for their firstborn child.

== The Philippines ==
A feature of some Filipino weddings is the money dance. Men line up in front of the bride and pin money to her dress or veil, then dance with her. The same sequence occurs with the groom; women line up in front of him and pin money to his clothing. Money pinned or taped onto the new married couple's garments represents a wish that good fortune be "rained" upon them, and is also a means of helping the couple financially as they begin their life together.

== See also ==
- Wedding traditions and customs
