= Owanbe =

Lavish Nigerian parties with music and food

- Native name: Ówàńbẹ̀
- Date: Varies
- Location: Nigeria, Benin, Togo (native to Yorubaland), and the diaspora
- Also known as: Ówàḿbẹ̀
- Type: Social event
- Budget: Varies
- Participants: Yoruba people and others in attendance
- Activity: Music, Dance, Food, Fashion, Merriment, Money spraying
- Attendance: Varies
- Genre: Celebration

Owanbe (sometimes wrongly spelt Owambe) is a Yoruba term for extravagant parties thrown by the Yoruba people in Yorubaland and the diaspora. The term is derived from the Yoruba expression "Ó wà ní ibẹ̀", directly translating to mean; The place where it is at, but more nuancedly referring to a party or event (often elaborate), where there is a lot of celebration going on. Coinage of the term is attributed to the band of Jùjú musician Tunde Nightingale active from the 1940s. The word soon became synonymous with his brand of Juju music (Owanbe sound) as well as club and party life in urban Western Nigeria with other such musicians as I. K. Dairo and Ebenezer Obey in performance.

Being occasions to see and be seen, the term can also mean the presence of a person or thing, as in: "is Fela there? Yes, Ówàńbẹ̀!". Ówàńbẹ̀ parties mark various occasions, including weddings, birthdays, anniversaries, funerals, housewarmings, graduations, and chieftaincy titles. They are known for their opulence, style, and abundance of food, music, dance, and money.

== History ==
Ówàńbẹ̀ parties have historical roots dating back to the pre-colonial era practices of Yorubaland. Yoruba kingdoms, such as Oyo, Ife, Ijebu, Ondo and Egba, were known for their cultural sophistication and tradition of celebrating significant events and milestones in Owanbe-esque events. For instance, the Oyo Empire held the annual Bẹrẹ festival where subjects from all over the empire and other well wishers converged at the capital of Oyo Ile. The Ondo Kingdom celebrated the annual Ekimogun and Odun Oba festivals, and Ife Empire celebrated the Odun Olojo, or Day of Creation.

Starting in the colonial period, the Yoruba culture began to interface with and blend various influences from the British Empire as well as the material input of emancipated returnees from the Americas called the Amaros or Agudas, such as elaborate carnival processions of masquerades. These cross-cultural influences within the larger Yoruba in-situ environments of Lagos, Ibadan and other urban locales, led to the emergence of a unique Ówàńbẹ̀ subculture as a form of both social expression and resistance. In the post-colonial era, Ówàńbẹ̀ parties evolved and expanded in scope, becoming more popular among different Nigerian ethnic groups and influenced by global trends and technologies.

== Features ==
The parties are characterized by several distinctive features, including music, dance, food, fashion, and the practice of spraying money:

=== Music and dance ===
Music and dance are essential components of Ówàńbẹ̀ parties, providing entertainment for guests. A variety of musical genres are played, ranging from traditional to modern, with diverse dance styles. Some popular musicians who perform at Ówàńbẹ̀ parties include King Sunny Adé, Ebenezer Obey, Oliver de coque and others. Guests often engage in dance competitions and show their skills.

=== Food ===
Food is an important aspect of Ówàńbẹ̀ parties, symbolizing hospitality and abundance. The cuisine includes local and continental dishes, prepared by professional caterers or family members to satisfy guests' appetites. Various drinks complement the food.

=== Fashion ===
Fashion plays a significant role in Ówàńbẹ̀ parties, with guests often wearing Aso ebi to indicate belonging to a particular group or family. This practice involves a specific fabric and colour chosen by the hosts. Guests showcase their style and personality through their clothing and accessories.

=== Spraying of money ===
Spraying money is a distinctive feature of Ówàńbẹ̀ parties, representing appreciation and support for the hosts and performers. Money is thrown or sprayed in various forms and denominations, and its meaning ranges from gratitude to wealth display. However, the practice has also faced criticism due to concerns about resource use and potential violations of currency-related regulations.

== Types ==
Ówàńbẹ̀ parties are classified based on the occasion, with common types including weddings, birthdays, and funerals, among others. Each type offers an opportunity for celebration, with weddings being especially popular, involving various ceremonies and parties. Funerals, while generally solemn, can also have festive aspects depending on the circumstances.
