= Juju Jubilee =

Compilation album by Ebenezer Obey
- Released: 1985
- Genre: Jùjú
- Label: Shanachie

Ebenezer Obey chronology
Miliki Plus (1983)	Juju Jubilee (1985)	Get Yer Jujus Out (1989)

Juju Jubilee is an album by the Nigerian musician Ebenezer Obey, released in 1985. A compilation of songs that he recorded in Africa, it was his first album to be released in the United States. He supported it with his first North American tour, backed by a 20-piece band.

== Production ==
Obey had expanded the traditional jùjú sound by adding a trap set and more guitarists to a base of talking drums and call and response vocals. Many of the songs' lyrics reflected Obey's Christian beliefs. He referred to his music as the "miliki sound", which he claimed meant happiness or joy. Obey used steel guitar on several of the tracks; he used an organ on "Oro Alafia". The songs were edited down from the original Nigerian album versions.

== Critical reception ==
Professional ratings
Review scores
Source	Rating
All Music Guide	5/5 stars
The Boston Phoenix	3.5/4 stars
Robert Christgau	B+
The Encyclopedia of Popular Music	3/5 stars
MusicHound World: The Essential Album Guide	4/5 stars

The Los Angeles Times remarked on the similarities between Obey and King Sunny Adé but noted that "Obey's music occasionally acquires a stinging bite that vaguely recalls southern soul outfits like Booker T & the MGs and the Meters." The Daily Times-Advocate called the album "a danceable, electrified music built around traditional Yoruba rhythms and African hymns." The Province said that, unlike Adé's "crossover" music, Obey "stays more firmly rooted in traditional folk melodies, which are unspeakably gentle yet propulsively rhythmic." Robert Christgau criticized the decision to shorten the tracks but praised the "spectacular sounds throughout".

In 2003, Guitar Player included Juju Jubilee on its list of "essential" Nigerian jùjú albums. The Trouser Press Record Guide stated that Juju Jubilee "displays Obey's progression from grassroots juju to ever-more-sophisticated compositions... Unfortunately, it suffers from a severe case of enjoyment interruptus."

== Track listing ==
No.	Title	Length
1.	"Awa Ewe Iwoyi"
2.	"E Ma Se Lo"
3.	"A Fi Eni Oluwa Koyo (He Who God Delivers)"
4.	"Ohun Oju Ri Laiye"
5.	"Asiko Mi Ti To"
6.	"Ko Easy Lati Je Omo Okunrin"
7.	"Oro Alafia"
8.	"Oro Mi Ti Davo"
