= Prince Adekunle =

Nigerian Jùjú musician

General Prince Adekunle (1942–2017) was a Nigerian Jùjú musician. Born 22 October 1942, Adekunle was of Egba origin, from Abeokuta in Ogun State. Adekunle was a major innovator and force in the jùjú music scene, with his distinctive driving Afrobeat style. Famous musicians such as Sir Shina Peters and Segun Adewale started their careers playing with his band, the Western Brothers. Although he toured in England in the early 1970s, he did not become well known outside Nigeria.

== Music ==
Jùjú music, first developed by Tunde King in the 1930s, formed the basis of Prince Adekunle's music. Highlife musicians like Bobby Benson and Tunde Nightingale introduced jazz concepts and new instruments. Ebenezer Obey and Sunny Adé brought in amplified guitars and synthesizers. All these formed the basis for Adekunle's innovative and forceful new style of juju music. Afrobeat, pioneered in the late 1960s by Fela Kuti and others, was another major influence on Prince Adekunle and his band the Western State Brothers, later the Supersonic Sounds. With a cool but driving and sophisticated style, Prince Adekunle is considered one of the great artistes of Jùjú music.

== Influence ==
Afrobeat also influenced Adekunle's protégé Sir Shina Peters who created a unique high-speed "Afro juju" sound. Sir Shina Peters recalls that when he was young, he was befriended by Prince Adekunle. An agent said he should be called Prince Adekunle's son as a publicity stunt, and that was how he became known as Shina Omo Adekunle. Although the adoption was not real, people accepted it and in a way it became real. Shina Peters and Segun Adewale, who became two of the biggest stars of the 1980s, both started their careers performing in the mid-1970s with Prince Adekunle.

Jùjú music star and Soko dance exponent, Dayo Kujore, was another musician who owed much to Prince Adekunle, playing lead guitar on some of his classics such as "Aditu ede" and "Eda n reti eleya".

In May 2004, Adenkunle was among other musicians who met to discuss ways to reverse the current decline of jùjú music, while opposing the proposal by King Sunny Adé to form a jùjú musician's union.

== Death ==
Prince General Adekunle died on Saturday 2 September 2017.

== Discography ==
A partial list of LPs:

Date	Group	Album	Label
?	Prince Adekunle & his Western State Brothers	Orin Erin Tani Yio Fi We	Label unknown AALPS 002
1970	Prince Adekunle & his Western State Brothers	Awa Lomo Nigeria	Ibukun Orisun Iye MOLPS 1
1970s	Prince Adekunle & his Western State Brothers	Eniyan Laso Mi	Ibukun Orisun Iye MOLPS 3
1970s?	Prince Adekunle & his Western State Brothers	Se Rere Fun Mi / Fese Fun Wa Baba (7" 45)	Ibukun Orisun Iye MOK. 5
1970s	Prince Adekunle & his Western State Brothers	Aiye Le	Ibukun Orisun Iye MOLPS 4
1970s	General Prince Adekunle & his Western State Brothers	General Prince Adekunle in the United Kingdom	Ibukun Orisun Iye MOLPS 6
1970s	General Prince Adekunle & his Western Brothers	Kaiye Ma Se Wa	Ibukun Orisun Iye MOLPS 10
1970s	General Prince Adekunle & his Western Brothers	Asalamu Aleikun	Ibukun Orisun Iye MOLPS 25
1975	General Prince Adekunle & his Supersonic Sounds	You Tell Me That You Love Me Baby	Ibukun Orisun Iye MOLPS 30
1975	General Prince Adekunle & his Supersonic Sounds	Sunny Adé (EP)	Ibukun Orisun Iye MOEP25
1975	General Prince Adekunle & his Supersonic Sounds	Awodi Nfo Ferere	Ibukun Orisun Iye MOLPS 32
1979	General Prince Adekunle and His Supersonic Sounds	Vol. 3 Hypertension	Shanu Olu SOS 052
?	General Prince Adekunle & his Western Brothers	Good Old Music of Prince Adekunle	Ibukun Orisun Iye MOLPS 72
1980	General Prince Adekunle	Vol. 6	Shanu Olu SOS 112
1989	Prince Adekunle (The General) & his Supersonic Sounds	Survival	Ibukun Orisun Iye MOLPS 116
1990	General Prince Adekunle & his Supersonic Sounds	People!!!	Ibukun Orisun Iye MOLPS 118
