= Tunde King =

Nigerian musician (1910–1980s)

- Born: 24 August 1910; Lagos Island
- Died: 1980s
- Occupation: Musician

Tunde King (born 24 August 1910), was a Nigerian musician credited as the founder of Jùjú music. He had a great influence on Nigerian popular music.

Lagos in the 1920s and 1930s was peopled by a mixture of local Yoruba people and returnees from the New World. Together they created a form of music named "Palm Wine" that combined Yoruba folk music with musical idioms from countries such as Brazil and Cuba. Banjos, guitars, shakers and hand drums supported lilting songs about daily life. Jùjú music was Palm Wine music that originated in the Olowogbowo area of Lagos in the 1920s, in a motor mechanic workshop where "area boys" used to gather to drink and make music. Tunde King was the leader of this group.

== Life ==
Abdulrafiu Babatunde King was born in the Saro-dominated Olowogbowo area of Lagos Island on 24 August 1910. He was the son of Ibrahim Sanni King, a member of the minority Muslim Saro community. His father was a chief Native Court clerk at Ilaro, and had lived for some time in Fourah Bay, Sierra Leone.

Tunde King attended a local Methodist primary school and the Eko Boys High School. A schoolmate taught him to play guitar, and he became a leading member of a local group of "area boys" who hung out at a mechanic's shop on West Balogun Street. The group talked, drank beer and sang, accompanied by improvised instruments. By 1929, King had a clerical job and worked part-time as a singer and guitarist with a trio including guitar, samba and maracas, later changing to tambourine, guitar-banjo. and sekere (shaker). By the mid-1930s, he enjoyed considerable success, with several recordings and radio broadcasts, but he still relied on live performances to earn a living, often at private functions. For example, King played at the wake of the prominent doctor Oguntola Sapara in June 1935.

With the outbreak of World War II in 1939, Tunde King joined the Merchant Marines. He returned to Lagos in 1941, then disappeared for the next eleven years. He was rediscovered playing in Francophone ports such as Conakry and Dakar, and returned to Lagos in 1954. He died in the 1980s.

== Music ==
The guitar-centered Jùjú musical style blends African elements such as the Yoruba talking drum with Western and Afro-Cuban influences. Tunde King says that the name "Jùjú" itself originated when he bought a tambourine from a Salvation Army store, which he gave to his Samba drummer. The drummer developed a flamboyant style that included throwing the tambourine into the air and catching it, which the audience called Jù-jú, duplicating the Yoruba word for "throw" with tonal accent.

His trio expanded into a quartet, with King on six-string guitar-banjo and vocals, Ishola Caxton Martins on sekere (gourde rattle), Ahmeed Lamidi George on tambourine and Sanya ("Snake") Johnson on tomtom and supporting vocals. The band members created a moderately paced ensemble sound that backed up the guitar and vocals with simple harmonic progressions.

In the 1930s, Nigeria was a British colony. A Nigerian could go so far, but no further, in the government or in business, regardless of ability or qualifications. Tunde King expressed widespread feelings in his songs. In "Oba Oyinbo", he celebrated the ascension of King George VI of Britain, saying with quiet irony "We Have a father ... King George is our father ... White man Cameron (the governor) is our father ..." He went further in songs that were not recorded, expressing resentment more explicitly. The song "Soja Idunmota" describes a monument of a white soldier with a native carrier, whose head is hanging down, saying "Cruelly, they forget the common descent of man". In the song "Eti Joluwe," he said it was better for Yorubas to work for themselves than for the government.

== Recordings ==
The first mass recordings of Jùjú music were made by Parlophone of the EMI group, starting in 1936, released on 78 rpm shellac discs. Tunde King released a number of these recordings including "Eko Akete" and the classic "Oba Oyinbo" ("European King"). He was paid only a small amount to record each release, and earned a very small amount from royalties. However, the recordings were essential in establishing his reputation. Other recordings include "Sapara ti sajule orun", "Dunia (Ameda)" and "Ojuola lojo agan". In all, he made over 30 records. Two of his recordings, "Oba Oyinbo" and "Dunia" were included on an anthology CD Juju Roots: 1930s-1950s, released by Rounder Records in January 1985.

== Legacy ==
Tunde King's music influenced his contemporaries, as well as later players such as Akanbi Ege, Ayinde Bakare, Tunde Nightingale and Ojoge Daniel in the 1940s, players in the 1960s such as King Sunny Adé and Chief Commander Ebenezer Obey, who introduced electric guitars, 1970s stars such as General Prince Adekunle and continued to have great influence into the 1980s, when stars such as Sir Shina Peters and Segun Adewale were playing modern forms of Jùjú.
