= Were music =

Traditional Yoruba music style

Were music (Yoruba: Wéré) is a Yoruba music, which, like ajisari, is a way of using music to arouse the Islamic faithful to pray and feast during Ramadan festival in Yorubaland. Ajiwere or oniwere means "one who performs were music."

Unlike ajisari, were is performed in groups. Usually young men or boys, numbering up to ten or more, come together to write songs and practise dance moves. Again unlike ajisari, who sleep a bit and only come out at 2:00 in the morning, the "ajiwere" or "oniwere" leave their homes each night shortly after the Isha'a (8:00 PM) and Tarawih prayers. They'll then roam the streets singing and dancing till about 4:00 AM when they disperse to go prepare for that day's fasting. A couple of days before the end of Ramadan, all of the "ajiwere" or "oniwere" groups in the area meet in a townhall to compete for prizes—the grand prize is a shiny silver-plated trophy.

In early 1970s, were music genre became popular and forced its way into the mainstream Yoruba culture alongside other popular genres like sakara, apala, waka music, and sekere. The music was popularized by certain Ibadan singers/songwriters such as, the late Alhaji Dauda Epo-Akara, Ganiyu Kuti or Gani Irefin, and their Lagos counterparts led by Alhaji Sikiru Ayinde Barrister. The Were singers started playing at parties and concerts in both Ibadan and Lagos. Ultimately, Alhaji Dauda Epo-Akara started producing some hit SP and LP records. Although Alhaji Sikiru Ayinde Barrister was already popular in Lagos, but it was Alhaji Dauda Epo-Akara who introduced him to the very important Ibadan music lovers on one of his popular LPs, which he used to pay a professional homage to the influential record marketers of Ogunpa district in Ibadan. Alhaji Sikiru Ayinde Barrister would later create another musical genre called Fuji music, which was an offshoot of were music.
