= Haruna Ishola =

Nigerian musician

Haruna Ishola Bello MON (1919 – 23 July 1983) was a Nigerian musician, and one of the most popular artists in the apala genre.

== Music career ==
He was born in Ibadan, Nigeria. and regarded as the father of Apala Music in Nigeria, performing with musical instruments such as agogo bells, akuba, claves, drums, and the lamellophone.

Ishola's first album in 1948, Late Oba Adeboye (The Orimolusi Of Ijebu Igbo) released under His Master's Voice, was a commercial flop, but his relentless touring gave him a reputation as the most in-demand entertainer for parties among the wealthy Nigerian elite. In 1955, a rerecorded version of his 1948 album was released following the death of Oba Adeboye in an air accident on BOAC operated Argonaut G-ALHL, the re-released record soon raised his profile. Haruna Ishola began recording apala numbers in about 1955, and soon became the most popular artist in the genre, and one of the most respected praise singers in Nigeria. Ishola adapted and stuck to a strong traditionalist approach, citing both Yoruba proverbs and Koranic scripture in his songs, and introducing no Western musical instruments into his musical line-up. Before the end of 1950s, he introduced shekere into his music, and recorded a song in 1960 for Decca Records titled "Punctuality is the Soul of Business". In 1962, he recorded his first LP; it had two sides with five songs on each side. Three of the five songs on side A were in praise to prominent people. On side B, are singles "Mo so pe moku" and "Ika Ko Wunwon".

Ishola would sit when performing, surrounded by two talking drummers, lamellaphone, shakers, agogo bells, akuba, claves, and a chorus of singers. Also central to his sound was the agidigbo, a hollow lamellophone (thumb piano), both plucked and struck to create a hypnotic ostinato at the center of the apala sound. Andy Frankel, who produced Apala Messenger (IndigiDisc 2001), a retrospective of Ishola's work, lived in Nigeria during the 1980s. He wrote in the CD liner notes, "Among the most memorable anecdotes were that Haruna Ishola's voice was so powerful that his praise singing could kill its intended recipient if not provided with restraint. It went without saying that if you had to go, being done in by the praises of this man was not a bad option."

In 1969, Ishola started STAR Records Ltd., in partnership with jùjú musician, I.K. Dairo. This was the first African record label owned by its artists. In 1971, he released his largest selling album to date, Oroki Social Club on Decca Records, which sold over five million copies. The titular track from the album was an ode to the prestigious and popular nightclub in the city of Osogbo, where Ishola and his group performed concerts to sold-out audiences, sometimes even lasting between four and ten hours. He became one of the first Nigerian musicians to tour abroad, performing in Benin, the United Kingdom, Sweden, France, West Germany, and Italy.

Ishola died in 1982, in Ijebu Igbo, but his large catalog of recordings both on Decca and STAR endure. His son, Musiliu Haruna Ishola is also a musician, still performing and carrying on his father's legacy. He released a million-selling album, Soyoyo, in 2000.

== Conflict with business partner ==
Haruna Ishola was involved in a landmark case in Nigerian courts against his former business partner. In 1964, Ishola was looking to start his own record label to maximize his creative control and personal profits. He invited a reputable businessman, Nurudeen Omotayo Alowonle, to become his partner. Alowonle was an investor and a known name in the music industry. They also invited F. S. Balogun and another gentleman to be part of the business. Ishola was unable to afford a proper lawyer due to his prior label's mismanagement of his royalties, but knew that for the partnership to be legal, the terms of engagement must be documented. On May 28, 1964, the four signed a hand-written contract to become partners. The name they chose for the partnership was "Express Record Dealers Association". According to the agreement, "Express Record Dealers Association" was formed for the purpose of producing records with the distinguishing label mark Alowonle Sounds Studio. Nurudeen Alowonle was appointed the Managing Director of the firm. The business experienced massive success, but with the newfound glory came tension. In 1966, Alowonle was accused of embezzling record label profits and funds into his personal bank account. On February 7, 1967, the partnership was dissolved. Thereafter, the former partners decided to retire the name of the business.

While at a local music store in mid-1967, Ishola chanced upon new records bearing the name "Express Record Dealers Association". He bought some copies and began to make a discrete investigation. He wondered who could be so courageous to be using the trade name of the defunct partnership to market the records. It was Nurudeen Alowonle, the former Managing Director. Ishola brought his former partner to court, where the case was presided over by Honorable Justice George Sodeinde Sowemimo. Alowonle applied for a trademark on the name in November 1967, and upon producing the handwritten contract from 1964, Justice Sowemimo nullified Alowonle's trademark on the record label name and prohibited him from using the brand name on his own, and dictated that Alowonle pay Ishola for funds embezzled from 1966 until the end of the partnership when he was unable to produce valid documents stating that Ishola and the two other partners had been paid their fair share.
