= Akanbi Wright =

Akanbi Wright who was also known as Akanbi Ege was a Nigerian musician from Lagos and an important figure in the early history of juju music, he was instrumental in the popular use of talking drums within that music genre. His music gained popularity in the 1930s, playing with a band that once included another early juju exponent, Julius Araba. Wright's lyrics included political commentary about domestic and national issues, he was a supporter of Herbert Macaulay's NNDP and his last major hit was Demo lo L'eko, a boast about NNDP's widespread support in Lagos. During the war, he composed songs in support of the British war effort and Nigerian soldiers in Burma, one such song was a popular hit, The Five Nigerian R.A.F about five Nigerian trainees enrolled with the Royal Air Force.

Wright grew up in Olowogbowo, then a neighborhood dominated by Saro residents. He changed his last name from Wright to Ege, to support Nigeria's nationalism struggle.

== Recordings ==
- Everybody likes saturday night
- The five Nigerian RAF
- Emi mi lowo re
- Ore mi Ore mi
- Ore ala ida
- Hitler to nda yeru
- Iyawo to mo koko fe
