= Orlando Owoh =

Nigerian musician and activist

- Also known as: Chief Dr. Orlando Owoh
- Born: Stephen Oladipupo Olaore Owomoyela; 14 February 1932; Osogbo, Western Region, British Nigeria (now Osogbo, Osun State, Nigeria)
- Died: 4 November 2008 (aged 76) Lagos, Lagos State, Nigeria
- Genres: highlife
- Occupations: carpenter; Singer-songwriter; musician; band leader
- Instrument: vocals
- Years active: 1958–2008
- Label: Kola Ogunmola Theatre Group

Orlando Owoh (born Stephen Oladipupo Olaore Owomeyela; 14 February 1932 – 4 November 2008) was a Nigerian highlife musician and band leader of Yoruba origin.

== Biography ==
Stephen Oladipupo Olaore Owomoyela, later known as Chief Dr. Orlando Owoh, was born in Osogbo, Nigeria on 14 February 1932 to Chief Atanneye Owomoyela and Mrs. Christiana Morenike Owomoyela. His father hailed from Ifon, Ondo State, while his mother was from the town of Owo. His father was a carpenter who was also a part-time musician in Osogbo. As a young man Owoh initially entered into the carpentry trade until 1958, when he was hired by Nigeria's Kola Ogunmola Theatre Group to play drums and sing. Owoh went on to form Dr. Orlando Owoh and his Omimah Band in 1960, and over a musical career of forty years became one of the leading proponents of highlife music. With bands such as the Omimah Band and later the Young Kenneries and the African Kenneries International, Owoh remained popular in Nigeria, even as tastes moved to the newer jùjú and fuji styles. He had over 45 albums to his credit. Orlando Owoh died on 4 November 2008 and was laid to rest at his Agege residence in Lagos, Nigeria.

== Discography ==
Albums released by Dr. Orlando Owoh (not in chronological order):

- Aiye nyi lo Medley
- Ajanaku Daraba
- Apartheid
- Asotito Aye
- Awa de
- Ayo mi sese bere
- Cain ati Abel
- Easter special
- E ku iroju
- E Get As E Be
- Emi wa wa lowo re
- Experience
- Ganja I
- Ganja II
- Ibaje eniyan
- Igba aye Noah
- Ire loni
- I say No
- Iwa l'Oluwa Nwo
- Iyawo Olele
- Jeka sise
- Kangaroo
- Kennery de ijo ya
- Kose mani
- Late Dele Giwa
- Logba Logba
- Ma wo mi roro
- Message
- Mo juba agba
- Money 4 hand back 4 ground
- Oriki Ojo
- Orin titun
- Thanksgiving
- Which is which

His singles include (not in chronological order):

- Brother ye se
- Day by day
- Diana
- Ebe mo be ori mi
- Zo Muje
- Egi nado
- Elese (sinner)
- Fiba fun Eledumare
- Ma pa mi l'oruko da
- Ma sika Ma doro
- Modupe Medley
- Oju ni face
- Okan mi yin Oba orun
- Olorun Oba da wa lohun Medley
- Oro loko laya
- Rex Lawson
- Wa ba mi jo
- Yabomisa sawale
- You be my lover

This list of albums and singles is however not exhaustive.
