= Apala =

Music genre in Nigeria

- Stylistic origins: Yoruba music; Cuban music
- Cultural origins: 1930s, Yoruba people in Colonial Nigeria, British West Africa

Regional scenes
- Nigeria

Apala (or akpala) is a music genre originally developed by the Yoruba people of Nigeria, during the country's history as a colony of the British Empire. It is a percussion-based style that originated in the late 1930s. The rhythms of apala grew more complex over time and have influenced the likes of Cuban music, whilst gaining popularity in Nigeria. It has grown less religious centered over time.

Apala music is an offshoot of Wéré music. Instruments include a rattle (sekere), thumb piano (agidigbo) and a bell (agogô), as well as two or three talking drums.

Ayinla Omowura, Yekinni (Y.K.) Ajadi and Haruna Ishola - amongst others - were notable performers of apala music, these two icons played a major role in popularising the genre. It is distinct from, older than, and more difficult to master than fuji music. Although fuji music remains one of the most popular forms of traditional music amongst Yorubas in Nigeria, apala is still very popular amongst Muslims of the Yoruba ethnicity.

== Styles ==
=== Apala fusion, apala pop, apala trap and street pop ===
Variant styles of apala include apala pop, apala trap, and apala-fusion, with musical artists such as Terry Apala, Olamide, DJ Tunez and Seyi Vibez being prominent figures associated with apala-centered musical styles. Street pop, also known as street hop, is a genre that emerged in Nigeria in the 21st century. It blends experimental rap with vocal performance, integrating elements of Nigerian hip hop, Nigerian street music, and contemporary African genres. Street pop incorporates aspects of Western music, and its sound is notably influenced by apala music.
