= Ajisari =

Muslim who rouses others to pray and eat during Ramadan

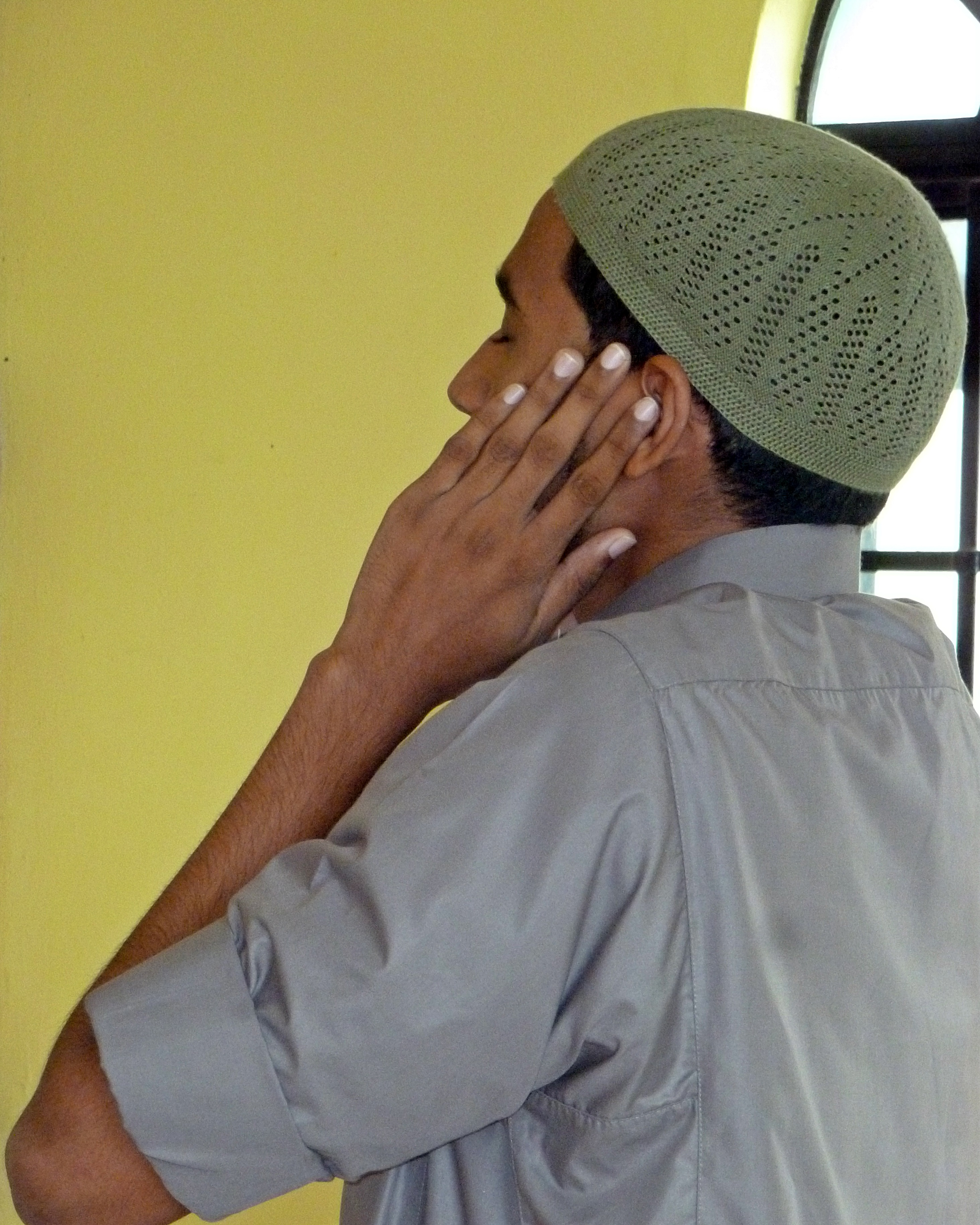

In Islam, an ajisãrì is one who arouses others to pray and feast during Ramadan. The term can also refer to the practice itself. They go from house to house, as early as 2:00 AM, beating their kettle drum with a stick and singing (screaming) at the top of their voice. This is purely a religious duty; it is voluntary. Although the ajisari does not expect to be compensated by their fellow believers, they believe that Allah will reward them, in the hereafter, for forsaking their bed and discomforting themselves during the month-long fasting period.

The name derives from the Arabic word "Suhur", meaning early morning meals during the holy month of Ramadan; it is spelled and pronounced "sãrì" in Yoruba.

An ajisari is seen as fearless because they believe Allah will protect them for doing his (Allah's) work. The ajisari practically works alone, which explains why they are sometimes called 'Lone Rangers'. So, unlike Were music, it is rare to see a group of ajisari. In the late 1970s, however, one group in Ibadan, Nigeria, Taiwo-Kehinde Ajisari (The Twin Brothers' Ajisari Group), broke that norm when they emerged.
