= Segun Adewale =

Nigerian musician (born 1949)

Omoba Segun Adewale (born 1949) is a Nigerian musician. He is considered the pioneer of yo-pop, a mix of funk, jazz, juju, reggae, and Afro-beat.

== Biography ==
Omoba Segun Adewale was born into a royal family in Osogbo Nigeria. Because his father objected to his career in music Adewale left home and moved to Lagos, Nigeria, where he met juju musicians S. L. Atolagbe and I. K. Dairo. In the 1970s, Adewale and Shina Peters both played with Prince Adekunle, a pioneer of Afrobeat Jùjú music.

== Musical career ==
In 1977 Adewale, along with Shina Peters, formed a new group called Shina Adewale and the Superstars International. They released nine recordings but split in 1980 to form their own separate groups. Some of his songs includes; Ojo Je, Atewo-Lara Ka Tepa Mo'se, and Bobo Gbe Mi Leke.
