= Agidigbo =

Instrument used by the Yoruba people to play Apala music

The agidigbo or ‘’’molo’’’ is a large traditional plucked lamellophone thumb piano used by the Yoruba people of Nigeria to play apala music.

It is a box, big enough to sit on a musician’s lap, with 4 to 5 strips of metal set up side by side on top like keys on a piano keyboard. The tongues are designed to vibrate. The musician uses their fingers to pluck them, the left hand plucking one or two rhythmic tongues, the right hand plucking the three melodic tongues. "The best players use as many fingers as possible." Players also tap the side of the instrument with a thick ring or the top with their thumbs or knuckles.

The instrument produces sonorous tones. Because of the Yoruba language's nature as a tonal language, the agidigbo can act as a musical “speech surrogate”, conveying language through its tones.

== Characteristics ==
The instrument consists of five metal tongues mounted onto the top of a box, approximately 2 ft x 2.5 ft and 9 inches high (estimated from photos). The tongues are bent to allow them to resonate. They are divided into a set of two and a set of three. The two are for rhythm; the three have a high, middle and low note for melody. Each set is played with a different hand so that the fingers may be used. A thick ring in a hand can also be used to drum on the instrument's wooden sides, and the thumb to drum the top.

The agidigbo is either played sitting, the instrument on the musicians lap, or suspended at waist level from a rope worn round the neck of the player.

== Tuning ==
The three melodic tongues are set with a second or third between adjacent tongues, with no more than a fifth between the lowest and highest notes. Tuning is relative to the other tongues.

The rhythmic tongues have a high and a low tone, compared to one another, but are not specifically tuned.

Tongues are placed form left to right:

- Omele ako (lower rhythmic)
- Omele abo (higher rhythmic)
- Ìyá-ìlù (low melodic note)
- Àdàmò (middle melodic note)
- Asájú (high melodic note)

== Surrogate for language ==
In African tonal languages such as Yoruba, instruments whose tone can be controlled can be played to simulate speech. Such speech-surrogate instruments include the Goje fiddle in Sakara music, the Iya ilu talking drum in Yoruba genres, and the Agidigbo thumb piano in Apala music.

Yoruba words are made of high, middle and low tones. Because the tones are important to meaning, they affect the melody. Yoruba musicians are able to combine “phonemic tones” into intelligible speech, using additional tools such as “konkolo rhythm” to add connotation.

‘’Konkolo’’ is a syncopated rhythm that may be described as long-short-short. There are 3, five and 7 stroke variations. “ these three stroke patterns that the linguistic attributes play an equal functional role in the musical development and stylistic use of these Yoruba indigenous rhythms.” Konkolo is an onomatopoeic word, the sound that a gong makes. The rhythm permeates Yoruba and other sub-Saharan African music.

Musicians can “encode” words into the music by building phonemes of high, middle and low tones, paired with Konkolo speech rhythms.

Three of the Agidigbo's tongues are set to high, middle, and low tones. This is done to imitate the phonemes of the Yoruba language. As musicians play the tones to build phonemes, and phonemes into syllables and words, those who speak the language can decode (or understand) the message.

Meaning is conveyed in the melodic rise and fall of tones in the words of the language, as well as the rhythm of the language, both of which are played.

== Popular use ==
The instruments was used for indigenous music into the 1920s. As new forms of popular music emerged, musicians adapted it. The instruments and its tonal qualities for into Apala music. The instrument is most popular in the Ibadan and Ijebu areas of Yorubaland.

It may accompany a sekere, or waka or an apala band.

Popular players included Adeolu Akinsanya, Haruna Ishola, Fatai Rolling Dollar, Ebenezer Obey.

Babatunde Olatunji famously plays an agidigbo on "Oyin Momo Ado" (Sweet as Honey), which is track 7 on his 1959 Drums of Passion album.

== See also ==
- Mbira
- Lamellophone
