= Tunde Nightingale =

Nigerian singer

Earnest Olatunde Thomas (10 December 1922 – 1981), known as Tunde Nightingale or The Western Nightingale, was a Nigerian singer and guitarist, best known for his unique jùjú music style, following in the tradition of Tunde King.

== Early life and career ==
Born in Ibadan, he attended school in Lagos, served in the army, and worked for a railway company. He formed his first group, a three-piece band comprising guitar, tambourine, and shekere, in 1944. This was at the onset of the period Nigerian musicians began to use guitar as part of their recordings. But his juju style of music was not the most popular among the Lagos elite who dominated the social scene and performances were limited to bars which provided limited income opportunities. In 1952, his band, Tunde Nightingale and His Agba Jolly Orchestra, which by now had expanded to eight members, held regular performances at the West African Club, Ibadan. His contemporaries included Ayinde Bakare, I. K. Dairo and Dele Ojo. Between 1954 and 1964, Nightingale's popularity fared better but still had few hits. In the mid-1960s, he signed a record deal with Mr Jossy Fajimolu. During this period, his music gained popularity among some socialites in Lagos who deemed it more suitable for social parties than dance halls. He developed his style of jùjú music that included room for praise and incantations as party music and rarely played at halls or dances. His style of music was known as So Wàmbè ("Is it there?"), possibly a double entendre reference to the beads draped over the hips of dancing women. By the 1960s, his popularity had grown among Lagos socialites, who sponsored him on a tour abroad. When he returned, he signed with the TYC label. In all, he recorded over 40 albums in his career. Modern stars like King Sunny Adé and Queen Ayo Balogun continue to be influenced by his style. Apart from the fact that he "sounded", literally, like a nightingale, he also kept a live bird in his home.
