= Dauda Epo-Akara =

Yoruba musician (1943-2005)

Dauda Akanmu Epo-Akara (23 June 1943 – August 2005), a Yoruba musician from the city of Ibadan, was the main force behind the popular Yoruba music genre called Awurebe.
