= Ayinde Bakare =

Nigerian musician

- Born: 1912; Lagos, Nigeria
- Died: 1 October 1972 (age 59/60) Lagos, Nigeria
- Genres: Jùjú, highlife
- Occupation: Bandleader
- Instruments: Guitar, banjo ukulele
- Years active: 1930s-1972
- Label: Melodisc

Ayinde Bakare (1912 – 1 October 1972) was a pioneering Yoruba jùjú and highlife musician in Nigeria.

== Early life ==
Saibu Ayinde Bakare Ajikobi was born in 1912 at Okesuna Lafiaji area of Lagos to a soldier father. His father, Pa bakare was from Ajikobi Compound in Ilorin, Kwara State.

== Education ==
He began his education at St. Mathias Catholic School, Lafiaji. Thereafter, he worked as an apprentice boatbuilder with the old Marine Department in Lagos.

== Career ==
After watching a band play at an engagement, he began his foray into music. He asked the band leader, Tunde King if he could be an apprentice with the band and was allowed by King to be a student. Bakare also played for an early juju exponent, Alabi Labilu.

He began performing around 1935, and first recorded on the His Master's Voice label in 1937.

One of his early juju tracks was Layinka Sapara, a praise song dedicated to the daughter of Oguntola Sapara, on the other side of the track was Ajibabi unlike Layinka was played with the more popular Sakara sound. Bakare formed a band which he later called Meranda after the film Miranda. The group started with four members (banjo ukulele, shekere, juju, vocals), but by 1949 had grown to seven members, and by 1959 to eight (electric guitar, shekere, juju, two varieties of conga (akuba and ogido), gangan, and two supporting vocalists). He is thought to have been the first juju musician to use an amplified guitar, in 1949, after switching to the guitar from the banjo ukulele. Bakare's innovations established the mainstream style of juju music in Nigeria after World War II. He tried to retain the same personnel within his bands, used his material rather than that from other bands, and tried to avoid diluting the traditional features of his music, believing that musical continuity would enhance its quality.

He was extremely popular with the socialites across Yorubaland, especially in Lagos and Ibadan in the 1950s and 1960s, gaining him the nickname "Mr Juju". He also visited and toured in Britain in 1957. Recordings made in London at that time by Bakare and his Meranda Orchestra were issued as singles in Britain by Melodisc Records, and were later compiled as an album, Live the Highlife, released in 1968.

=== Discography ===
His many records include a 1968 LP Live the Highlife (Melodisc MLPAS 12-140). Tribute to the late J. K. Randle / Eko Akete (Lagos Akete) / Adura Fun Awon Aboyun (Prayer for the Pregnant Women) / Ibikunle Alakija /Iwalewa (Your Manner is Your Beauty) / Ore Otito O Si (There's no true friend) / Mo b'eru Aiye (I fear the humanity) / Ile Aiye Ile Asan (Life is vanity upon vanity) / Agboola Odunekan / Olabisi Arobieke /Akambi Balogun.

- MLP 12-134 Great African Highlife Music Vol 2 Various Artists - includes

Ayinde Bakare – Iwa Lewa/ Adura Fun Awon Aboyun / Se Botimo / The Late J.K. Randle

Singles

- Melodisc: 1406 The Late J.K. Randle/Ibikunle Alakija
  - 1431 Iwa Lewa/J.O. Majekodunmi
  - 1446 Se Botimo/S. Ola Shogbola
  - 1465 Tafawa Balewa/Public Interest
  - 1467 Adura Fun Awon Aboyun/Fagbayi Contractor
  - 1492 Kamila Mustapha/Asewo Erori
  - 1588 Eko Dara Eko Ndun / Rt. Hon. Dr. Azikiwe

== Later life and death ==
He died in unexplained circumstances in 1972, after a performance at a wedding party in Lagos. The band took a break during the party, during which Bakare was summoned backstage. He never returned, and his body was found three days later floating in Lagos Lagoon. The police suspected foul play, and a coroner's inquest was held. The coroner found that he died from drowning, and cast suspicion on two members of his band who had complained about being underpaid, but said that there was no incontrovertible evidence as to their involvement.
