= Agogô =

Type of bell originating with the Yoruba and Edo peoples

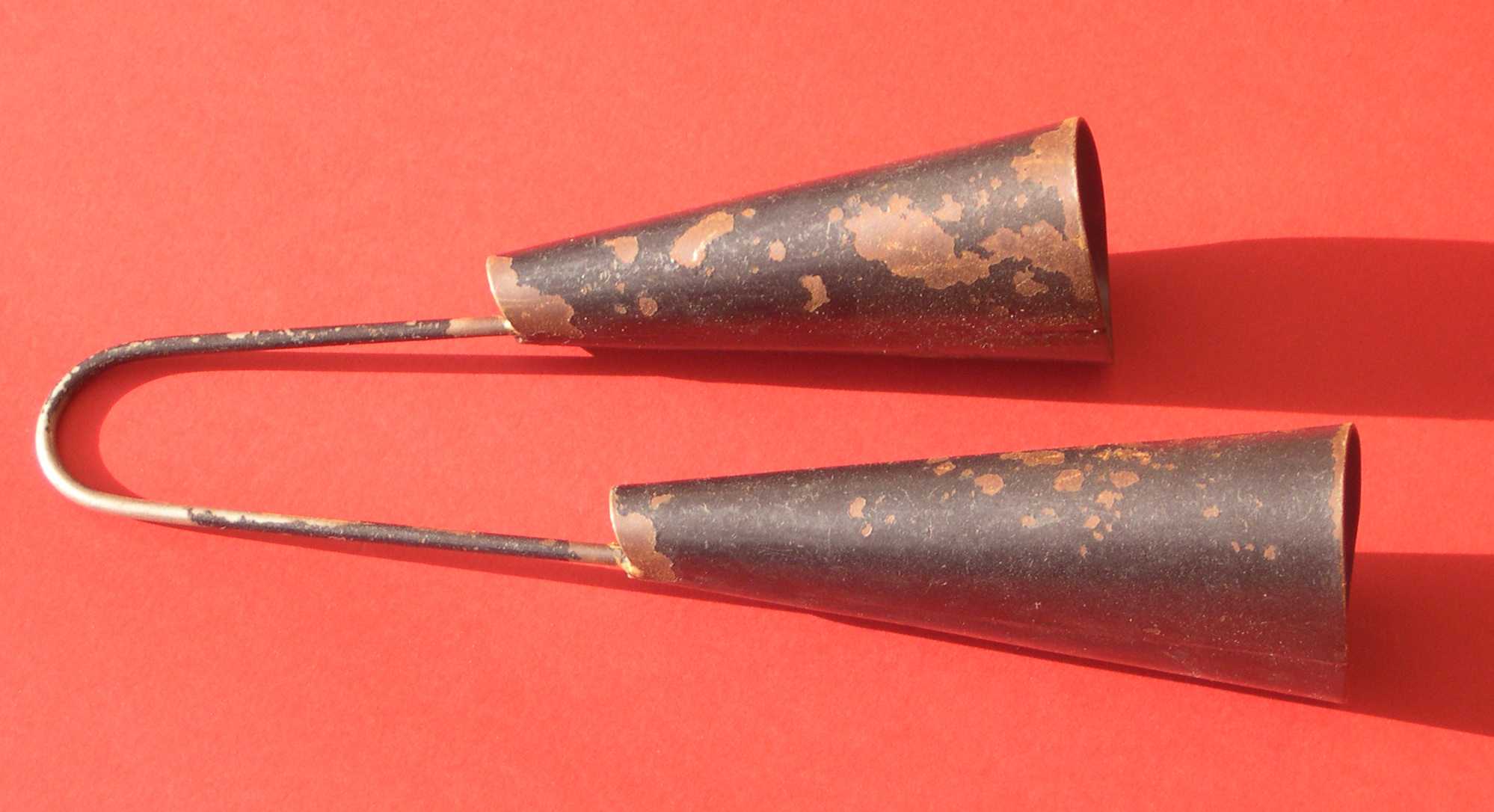
- Modern Agogô bell

Percussion instrument
- Other names: gan gan (smaller version)
- Hornbostel–Sachs classification: 111.242 (Bells)
- Timbre: Bright, uniform
- Volume: Medium to loud
- Attack: Fast
- Decay: Medium

An agogô (Yoruba: ['aɡoɡo]) is idiophone bell percussion instrument. With origins in West African music, it is now commonly used in traditional and popular Brazilian music. Agogôs are typically made from two cone-shaped pieces of metal with different pitches.

== Etymology ==
The word agogô is West African in origin. Ágogo is used by the Edo, Idoma, Igala, and Yoruba people of Nigeria to refer to a single or double clapperless bell. A broader category of all types of clapperless bells is referred to by the word òjè, which translates to "iron". The instrument's name and the knowledge of its construction were carried to the Americas by enslaved West Africans.

== Construction ==
Originally built from wrought iron, the agogô is now manufactured from a variety of metals and sizes for different sound qualities. The bells of a metal agogô are constructed from fan-shaped pieces of sheet iron rolled into cones. The two bells are then welded together using a U-shaped piece of metal. Each bell is a different length, which allows a differently pitched note to be produced depending on which bell has been hit. The pitch of the bell is determined by length; longer bells create a lower-frequency sound, while shorter bells are higher-pitched. Another factor determining sound quality is the thickness of the material. Thick-walled bells create less vibration, and thin bells vibrate more easily.

== Playing ==
The agogô is played by gripping the instrument in one hand, so that the handle is in the player's palm. The openings of the bells should face away from the player and the smaller bell should be above the larger one. The bells may be struck by a drumstick or another beater made from either wood or metal.

== Uses ==
=== Nigeria ===
Drums are a foundational component of Yoruba music, which, in turn, is integral to Yoruba cultural and religious life. The agogo features prominently in Ìpèsè, a drum ensemble used in Ifá festivals. The ensemble also plays during rituals to appease the gods. Additionally, the agogo plays a significant role in the Yoruba musical subgenres of Juju, Afro-juju, Apala, Fuji, and others. The instrument is often used by Nigerian performers to bring traditional Yoruba music to a larger audience.

=== Brazil ===
Enslaved West Africans were the first to introduce the agogô to Brazil. There, it is used in African-derived religious practices such as Candomblé, as well as to accompany capoeira, an Afro-Brazilian martial art. Along with European instruments, such as the seven-string guitar, and indigenous instruments, such as maracas, the âgogo played a significant role in 1920s choro ensembles. It has also gained a place in samba baterias, a rhythmic component of secular Carnival celebrations. Many Brazilian and Afro-Brazilian popular musicians use the âgogo in their songs, especially to create Afro-Brazilian rhythms and grooves.

== See also ==
- Cowbell (instrument)
- Claves
- Cultural appropriation
