= Shina Peters =

Nigerian Jùjú musician (born 1958)

Sir Shina Peters
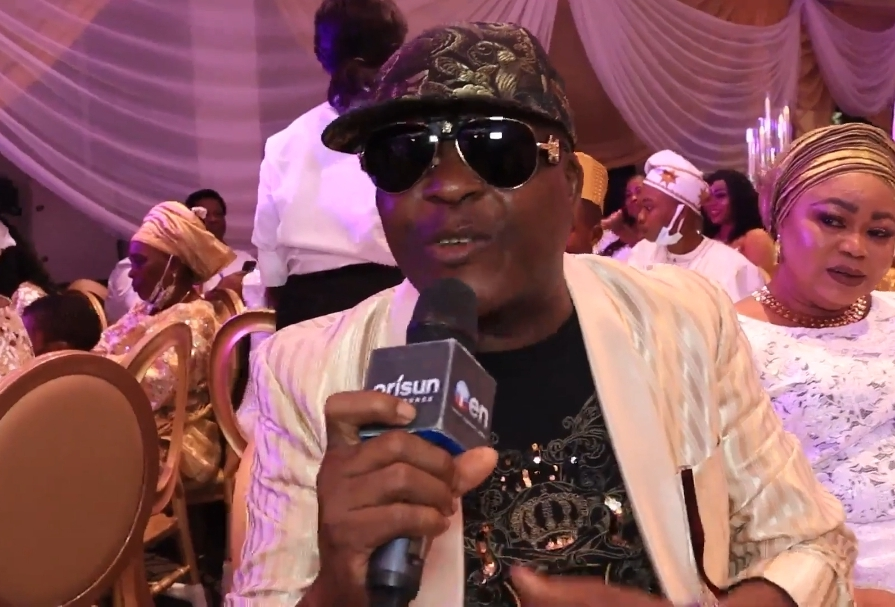

Background information
- Born: Oluwashina Akanbi Peters; 30 May 1958 (age 68); Western Region, British Nigeria (now Ogun State, Nigeria)
- Genres: Jùjú
- Occupation: musician

Sir Shina Peters (born Oluwashina Akanbi Peters; 30 May 1958) is a Nigerian Jùjú musician.

== Life ==
Born Oluwashina Akanbi Peters in Ogun State, Peters' career in music began at a young age when he played with friends under the handle Olushina and His Twelve Fantastic Brothers. While playing with his friends, he taught himself how to play the piano and later joined Ebenezer Obey's band. Thereafter, he left Obey's band and joined General Prince Adekunle's band as a guitar player. Adekunle's band played in Lagos hotels such as Western Hotel, Palm Beach Hotel and Executive Hotel. When Adekunle was ill, Peters sometimes acted as lead singer. He left Adekunle to form Shina Adewale, a band with Segun Adewale. However, the duo soon split. Shina Peters, after releasing many albums with Segun Adewale through the 1980s, went on to form his own band, "Sir Shina Peters & His International Stars".

Peters was an actor in 'Money Power', a movie produced by Ola Balogun. He met and started a relationship with the actress Clarion Chukwura at this time. The couple has a son, Clarence Peters.

=== Career breakthrough ===
Sir Shina Peters and his International Stars released their first album Ace (Afro-Juju Series 1) in 1989. The album, which was released under CBS Records of Nigeria, went double platinum. "Ace," produced by Laolu Akins, is a musical fusion between Juju and Afrobeat. Afro juju musical style mixes fast percussive beat with the use of electronic keyboards, saxophone and guitar. Some of the lyrics in the album especially in 'Ijo Shina' were quite racy for the period. The album went on to garner awards for Peters including the artist and album of the Year at the Nigerian Musical Awards. He followed 'Ace' with 'Shinamania'; the album had singles such as 'Oluwa Yo Pese', 'Omo Bo' and 'Give Our Women Chance'. Sir Shina Peters currently has 16 album releases to his credit.

== Discography ==
1. Way to Freedom (1980)
2. Freedom (1981)
3. Money Power (1982)
4. Ko Temi fun mi (1984)
5. Sewele (1986)
6. Ace "Afro Juju Series 1 (1989)
7. Shinamania (1990)
8. Dancing Time (1991)
9. Experience (1992)
10. Mr. President (1993)
11. My Child (1994)
12. Kilode (1995)
13. Love (1996)
14. Reunion (1997)
15. Playmate (1999)
16. Happy Hour (2001)
17. Pay Back Time (2005)
18. Splendour (2006)
19. D one 4 me (2012)

== See also ==
- List of Nigerian musicians
