= I. K. Dairo =

Nigerian musician (1930–1996)

Isaiah Kehinde Dairo
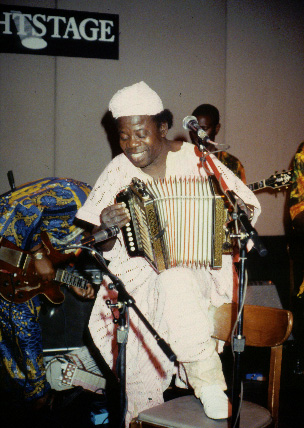

Background information
- Born: 1930; Ofa, Kwara State
- Died: 7 February 1996 (aged 65)
- Genres: Folk, Jùjú music
- Occupation: Singer-songwriter
- Instrument: Accordion
- Years active: 1957–1996

Isaiah Kehinde Dairo PronounciationMBE (1930 – 7 February 1996) was a Nigerian Jùjú musician.

== Early life ==
I.K. Dairo was born in the town of Offa, located in present-day Kwara State; his family was originally from Ijebu-Jesa before migrating to Offa. He attended a Christian Missionary primary school in Offa, however, he later quit his studies due to a lean year in his family's finances. He left Offa and traveled to Ijebu-Jesa where he chose to work as a barber. On his journey, he took along with him a drum built by his father when he was seven years old. By the time he was residing in Ijebu-Jesa, he was already an avid fan of drumming. When he was unoccupied with work, he spent time listening to the early pioneers of jùjú music in the area and experimented with drumming.

His interest in jùjú music increased over time, and in 1942, he joined a band led by Taiwo Igese but within a few years, the band broke up. In 1948, he went to Ede, a town in present-day Osun State where he started work there as a pedestrian cloth trader and played music with a local group on the side. One day, while his boss was away traveling, I.K. Dairo decided to join his fellow friends to play at a local ceremony, unknown to him, his boss was coming back that same day, the boss was furious with the act and he was relieved of his job as a result.

I.K. Dairo later pursued various manual tasks after his firing and was able to save enough money to move to Ibadan, where Daniel Ojoge, a pioneer Jùjú musician usually played. He got a break to join a band with Daniel Ojoge and played for a brief before returning to Ijebu-Ijesa, most of the gigs he plays with Ojoge's band were at night.

== Career ==
I.K. Dairo's musical career entered the fast lane when he founded a ten-piece band called the Morning Star Orchestra in 1957. In 1960, during the celebration of Nigeria's independence, the band was called on to play at a party hosted by a popular Ibadan-based lawyer and politician Chief D O A Oguntoye. With a lot of prominent Yoruba patrons at the venue, I.K. Dairo showcased his style of jùjú music and earned attention and admiration from other Yoruba patrons present, many of whom later invited him to gigs during cultural celebrations or just lavish parties. In the early 1960s, he changed the band's name to Blue Spots and he also won a competition televised in Western Nigeria to showcase the various talents in jùjú music. During the period, he was able to form his record label in collaboration with Haruna Ishola and achieved critical and popular acclaim and fame.

=== Influences and inspiration ===
I.K. Dairo's emergence in the late 1950s coincided with the growing sense of anticipation surrounding Nigerian independence. He was widely regarded as a leading musician capable of capturing the spirit of that transitional moment, both in the period immediately preceding independence and in the years that followed. Musical tastes of the era had shifted from more restrained forms toward livelier, more energetic sounds, reflecting the celebratory mood of the time. This period was also marked by elaborate social gatherings at which live music featured prominently.

I.K. Dairo musical success in the 1960s, was influenced by different factors including a resort to include traditional sounds, the political life of the 1950s, which inspired him and a focus on Rhythm, beats and tempo that reflected different ethnic sounds and in the process leading to his appeal rising beyond his primary ethnic group. His band experimented and played with musical styles originating from different Yoruba areas and also used the Edo, Urhobo, Itsekiri and Hausa language in some of their lyrics. The band's well organized and slick arrangement, Yoruba and Latin America influenced dance rhythm and patronizing lyrics on the entrepreneur pursuits of patrons were factors that contributed in his rise to the height of the Juju and musical arena in the country. He also employed musical syncretism, mixing the Ijebu-Ijesa choral multi-part sound with melodies and text from Christian sources.

In 1962, he released the song 'Salome' under Decca records. The song mixed traditional elements in Yoruba culture and urban life as major themes. The song was a major hit of his. Another song of his which was quite popular was Ka Sora (Let Us Be Careful), the song is sometimes described as predictive of the Nigerian Civil War in its warning about the pitfalls of unreasoned governance. He also released other popular hits including one about Chief Awolowo, who was incarcerated at the time the song was released.

=== Instruments ===
The band made use of an amplified accordion, which was played by I.k., and he was the first high-profile musician to play the accordion. Other musical instruments used by the group includes, electric guitar, talking drum, double toy, akuba, ogido, clips, maracas, agogo (bell), samba (a square shaped drum).

=== Later career ===
Dairo's stay at the top in the Nigerian music scene was short lived, by 1964, a new musician; Ebenezer Obey; was gaining ground and by the end of the 1960s, both Obey and King Sunny Adé had emerged as the popular acts of the period. However, Dairo continued with his music, touring Europe and North America in the 1970s and 1980s. He was also involved in a few interest groups dealing with the property rights of musicians. Between 1994 and 1995, he was a member of the Ethnomusicology department at the University of Washington, Seattle.

=== Partial discography of I.K. Dairo and the Blue Spots ===
CD

- Ashiko, 1994, Xenophile Music
- Definitive Dairo, Xenophile Music
- I Remember, Music of the World
- Juju Master, Original Music

Records

- Salome 92
- Ise Ori Ranmi Ni Mo Nse
- I Remember My Darling,
- Erora Feso Jaiye
- Se B'Oluwa Lo Npese
- Yoruba Solidarity
- Mo ti yege
- Ashiko Vols 1&2 Early 1970s'
