= Ebenezer Obey =

Nigerian jùjú singer and songwriter (born 1942)

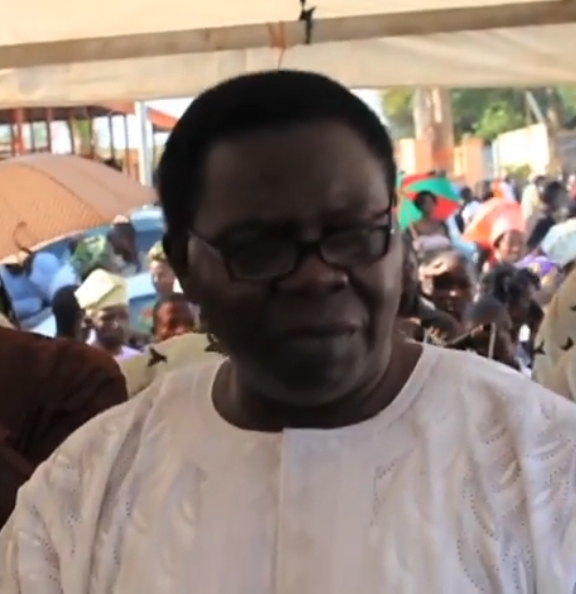

Background information
- Also known as: Chief Commander
- Born: Ebenezer Remilekun Aremu Olasupo Obey-Fabiyi; 3 April 1942 (age 84); Idogo, Southern Region, British Nigeria (now Idogo, Ogun State, Nigeria)
- Origin: Lagos, Nigeria
- Genre: Jùjú music
- Years active: 1950s–present

Ebenezer Remilekun Aremu Olasupo Obey-Fabiyi MFR (born 3 April 1942), known professionally as Ebenezer Obey, is a Nigerian jùjú musician.

== Early life ==
Obey was born on 3 April 1942 to an Egba–Yoruba ethnic background family. Obey, whose real names are Ebenezer Remilekun Aremu Olasupo Fabiyi, was born in Idogo, Ogun State, Nigeria of Egba-Yoruba ethnic background. He is of the Owu subgroup of the Egba.

== Career ==
Ebenezer Obey began his professional career in the mid-1950s after moving to Lagos. After tutelage under Fatai Rolling-Dollar's band, he formed a band called The International Brothers in 1964, playing highlife–jùjú fusion. The band later metamorphosed into Inter-Reformers in the early-1970s, with a long list of Juju album hits on the West African Decca musical label.

Obey incorporated Yoruba percussion style into his music and expanded his ensemble by adding additional drum kits, guitars, and talking drums. His compositions frequently included Yoruba aphorisms and follow the conventions of Yoruba social-circle music, which often features praise-singing directed at prominent individuals. He also recorded music with Christian themes and, beginning in the early 1990s, shifted his focus toward gospel performance. Obey has performed with other Nigerian gospel musicians, including Pastor Kunle Ajayi's 30-year stage anniversary concert in Lagos.

== Personal life ==
Obey married Juliana Olaide Olufade in 1963. His wife, known as Lady Evangelist Juliana Obey-Fabiyi, died at Lagos State University Teaching Hospital on 23 August 2011, aged 67. They have several children and grand children.

== Partial discography ==
- 1964 Ewa Wo Ohun Ojuri
- 1965 Aiye Gba Jeje b/w Ifelodun*Gari Ti Won b/w Orin Adura
- 1966 Awolowo Babawa Tide b/w Oluwa Niagbara Emi Mi*Palongo b/w Teti Ko Gboro Kan*Oro Miko Lenso b/w Orin Ajinde*Late Justice Olumide Omololu b/w Iyawo Ti Mo Ko Fe
- 1967 Olomi Gbo Temi b/w Maria Odeku*To Keep Nigeria One b/w Awa Sope Odun Titun*Edumare Lon Pese b/w Omo Olomo*Ope Fun Oluwa b/w Paulina
- 1968 Ore Mi E Si Pelepele b/w Ajo Ni Mo wa*Ijebu L'ade b/w Lati Owolabi*Col. Ben Adekunle b/w Ori Bayemi*Lolade Wilkey b/w Adetunji Adeyi*Gbe Bemi Oluwa b/w Olowo Laiye Mo
- 1969 Ode To Nso Eledumare b/w Pegan Pegan*Sanu-olu b/w K'Oluwa So Pade Wa*London Lawa Yi b/w Oro Seniwo*Isokan Nigeria / etc.*Eni Mayo Ayo / etc1969/1970*Emi Yio Gbe Oluwa Ga b/w Ise Teni
- 1970 Lawyer Adewuyi*Ala Taja Bala b/w Ohun Toluwa Ose*Ogun Pari / etc.*In London*On The Town
- 1971 Ija Pari (Part One) b/w Ija Pari (Part Two)*Esa Ma Miliki b/w Awon Alhaji*Face to Face b/w Late Rex Lawson*Oro Nipa Lace b/w Yaro Malaika
- 1972 Late Oba Gbadelo II*Board Members*Vol.4: Aiye Wa A Toro*In London Vol. 3*Odun Keresimesi
- 1973 And His Miliki Sound*The Horse, The Man and His Son*E Je Ka Gbo T'Oluwa*Adeventure of Mr. Music*Mo Tun Gbe De
- 1974 Inter-Reformers A Tunde*Eko Ila*Around the World*Iwalka Ko Pe
- 1975 Mukulu Muke Maa Jo*Ota Mi Dehin Lehin Mi*Alo Mi Alo*Edumare Dari Jiwon
- 1976 Late Great Murtara Murtala Ramat Muhammed*Operation Feed The Nation
- 1977 Eda To Mose Okunkun*Immortal Sings for Travellers*Adam and Eve
- 1978 Igba Owuro Lawa*Oluwa Ni Olusa Aguntan Mi*No Place Be Like My Country Nigeria
- 1979 In the Sixties Vol.1*In the Sixties Vol.2*Igba Laiye*Sky*E Wa Kiye Soro Mi*Omo Mi Gbo Temi
- 1980 Leave Everything to God*Current Affairs*Sound of the Moment*Eyi Yato
- 1981 Joy of Salvation*What God Has Joined Together
- 1982 Celebration*Austerity*Precious Gift
- 1983 Ambition*Singing for the People*Greatest Hits Vol. 3*Je Ka Jo*Thank You (Ose)
- 1984 The Only Condition to Save Nigeria*Solution*Peace1985*Security*My Vision
- 1985 Juju Jubilee
- 1986 Gbeja Mi Eledumare*Satisfaction*Providence
- 1987 Aimasiko*Immortality*Victory*Patience
- 1988 Determination*Vanity
- 1989 Formula 0-1-0*Get Yer Jujus Out
- 1990 Count Your Blessing*On the Rock
- 1991 Womanhood
- 1993 Good News
- 1994 I Am a Winner*Walking Over (1994 ?)
- 1995 The Legend
- 1999 Millennial Blessings
- 2000 Promised Land
- 2002 Ase Oluwa

== See also ==
- List of Nigerian gospel musicians
- List of Nigerian musicians
