= Jùjú music =

Nigerian genre of music

Jùjú (Yoruba: [d͡ʒùd͡ʒú]) is a style of Yoruba popular music, originated in Lagos, Nigeria. It first began developing in the 1920s with Tunde King (Abdulrafiu Babatunde King). Early styles of jùjú music consisted of banjo or acoustic guitar, drums, gourd rattle, tambourine, and vocals. Call-and-response singing is common in jùjú music along with harmonies, repetitive refrains, and polyrhythmic percussion. Other musical elements like improvisation and expressive vocal styles are often found. Although jùjú music was developing in the 1920s, a recognizable genre did not emerge until the mid-1930s. Jùjú music emerged in Lagos in 1932, and was influenced by palm wine guitar music. Jùjú was also strongly influenced by Asikò dance drumming, which is tied to Yoruba Christian communities. Lyrics include praise and storytelling, reflecting themes such as identity, community, life, spiritual beliefs and social commentary. Jùjú performances often lasted hours without any breaks. Bands often had a repertoire that they could play from memory. The bandleader had the responsibility of assessing the crowd at the social event and adjusting their performance according to the audience's preferences.

== History ==
=== Instrumentation ===
When jùjú music was first developing, groups often formed as trios. This included a bandleader who sang and played the banjo, a tambourine player, and a sèkèrè (gourd rattle) player. Sometimes a fourth person would be added as a supporting vocalist. By the end of World War II, jùjú bands were mostly quartets.

In the early days of jùjú music instruments would include acoustic guitar, banjo, drums, gourd rattle, tambourine and vocals. After World War II, musicians started to form competing bands, incorporating new instruments and regional styles. Some of these instruments included electric guitars, synthesizers, pedal steel guitar, and sometimes saxophones. Talking drums are also found in jùjú music, but were not introduced to the genre until 1948. Other instruments like the thumb piano, various conga-type drums and Hawaiian guitar emerged into the genre as well. The later adoption of electric amplifiers allowed for larger jùjú ensembles.

Influences

Juju music evolved out of the relationship between social habits and musical concepts, and the need for social interaction among a group of 'rascals' or 'area boys' in the old Saro (Olowogbowo) quarter

The largely Christian community of the Olowogbowo area of Lagos church melodies were important sources of structural material for the area boys. The style used at Christian wake keeping ceremonies was especially important. It was often characterized as having free musical expression unhampered by the strictness of keeping to a rigid four-part organization. The area boys preferred attending wake keeping ceremonies over more formal church services, which made them conversant with several hymn-tune-derived church melodies set to lyrics in Yoruba and with the concomitant melodic progressions and framework of the diatonic scale. One example of how Church melodies and melodic progressions influenced Juju is through Tunde King’s Yisa Imouru.“The elements that can be traced directly to the church hymn include the seven tone diatonic scale, the sequential treatment of the first line of the text, the parallel thirds especially at the cadence point, the free combination of voices which follows the usual form of hymn-tune singing at wakes, and the relatively free treatment of the speech tone patterns of the yoruba text.

Along with church hymns, asiko music is found in the lyrical style of Tunde King. Asiko dance music is the predecessor of Juju. Abdulrafiu Tunde King was born and grew up during the height of the asiko dance music craze in the 1920s. Tunde King attended gatherings of area boys at Till Nelson's motor-mechanic workshop to drink, make music, and, in general, have fun. Tunde King often performed musical entertainment at the gatherings, improvising on esa texts associated with asiko dance music or on such simple folksongs as Orin Kurumo, and thereby fashioning a framework for his social commentary in the Yoruba language

=== Foreign Influences ===
Alongside local religious influences, three key imported musical influences helped shape Tunde King's creation of jùjú music.

The first key influence was the tambourine drum, which was introduced to Lagos in 1920 by The Salvation Army. It could mimic speech in interactive musical settings. The tambourine was locally known as “eight corners,” and was also believed to elevate mental and spiritual awareness. Because of this mystical association, people from Lagos began calling the music “jùjú”, which was a colonial term for African spiritual practices.

The second imported stylistic influence was samba music and drums from the Brazilian community in Lagos. This community consisted of Yoruba people captured and sold to Brazil during the slave trade, who had then bought their freedom and returned to their homeland, bringing with them Brazilian culture that they had adopted from years spent in captivity and forced assimilation. One of these cultural imports was the carata masquerade. The Samba Drum was introduced to Lagos at the end of the 19th century by this ex-slave community. The Samba Drum was one of the principal instruments in the asiko bands that influenced Tunde King during his childhood and adolescence. Also, Samba music of the period had a pulse of two beats, which can be found in an analysis of Tunde King's music. Samba of the time had a steady two-beat pulse that inspired jùjú's duple rhythmic structure. The difference is that In addition to this duple rhythm, Jùjú incorporates syncopated melodies layered over percussion patterns and steady guitar.

The third influence came from Kru sailors from Liberia. When they docked at ports in Lagos, they gathered in the Olowagbowo area and would entertain themselves with songs that would become known to the young boys in the area. There folk songs (often in a " call-and-response style) and two-finger guitar technique called “Krusbass” inspired the harmonic foundation of jùjú. Tunde King used “krusbass” as an accompaniment when playing music with the area boys. This evolved into a standard tuning progression called “Johnny Walker is a Mighty Man,” which became central to Tunde King's compositions.

=== Evolution of the genre ===
Like many genres, Juju music as evolved because of the Yoruba people's general openness to incorporating foreign styles and technologies. The sort of changes that have taken place in juju music, in which synthesizers may be used to "talk" and multiple electric guitars are arranged in interlocking patterns like drums in a traditional ensemble.

During Juju's formative stage in the 1930's evolution came in the form of experimentation and incorporation of novel instruments, rhythms, tones and melodies from varied sources. However, by the 1940's Juju musicians combined innovations in music with novel instruments. Musician Akanbi 'Ege' Wright introduced the gangan, the Yoruba talking drum, while another musician Sunday Harbour Giant introduced the penny whistle flute, the organ, and the mandoline.

In the 1940's the texts of juju songs reflected on important events occurring in the lives of individuals and the community. Their moral tone was reflective and informative, and in this way they provided avenues for the communication of thoughts and messages about immediate events or incidents related to society or the social and moral life of those involved. However, with new social and political changes in Nigeria from the 1950s onward, Juju shifted from recreational music used partly to commemorate significant events, to highly popular urban dance and party music.

However, the most significant shift came with the emergence of Isaiah Kehinde Dairo, also known as I.K Dario. Like other juju musicians before him, he introduced new, novel instruments to the genre, such as the accordion and mouth organ. However, his greater contribution came more from his exploitation to the fullest of the highly distinctive modes of musical expression characteristic of the Ijebu-Jesha Yoruba people. This resulted in Dario moving away from the cosmopolitan tone of his preceding artists and instead focusing on regional styles of singing, rhythms and melodies, verses and expression that matched the experiences of an average person in the village.

=== Popularity and decline ===
Another name for jùjú music that was considered more performative is "Tombo bar music".

Traditional African popular music is categorized into two types: one for dancing, and one for individual expression. Jùjú music, however, mixes the two styles to create a unique genre. Jùjú music was and is used for expressing cultural identity in Nigeria, especially in the late 1950s and early 1960s after World War II when Nigeria gained its independence from the United Kingdom. This is when nationalism was at its highest in the country.

Most jùjú groups remained semi-professional, which allowed them to make a second income. There were higher status and lower status ensembles of jùjú music that reflected the genre's diverse audience including civil servants, artisans and daily paid labourers. The most successful jùjú groups are based in Lagos, which is Nigeria's modern and cultural capital, and Ibadan plays a secondary role as a supporting hub for the popular music scene.

Modern jùjú music, by artists such as Chief Commander Ebenezer Obey and King Sunny Adé, reflects the influence of modernization and cultural blending. However, it still strongly holds traditional Yoruba music styles and social values. Jùjú began among the lower class in Yoruba cities, but with the help of recordings, it has grown in popularity, crossing social boundaries and reaching people of different religions, ages and backgrounds.

Competition from fuji music led to the decline of jùjú in the 1980s. Although jùjú music still remained popular, it has faced increased competition from newer genres.

=== Influence of Tunde King ===
Tunde King (Abdulrafiu Babatunde King) was the first artist of jùjú music in the 1920s. A guitarist from Lagos, Tunde King began by playing and improvising Asiko music and folk songs during social gatherings with the "Area Boys" trio in Olowogbowo.

His music mixed Asiko rhythms and social commentary, and used the two-finger guitar style known as "krusbass." He was known to have a high vocal register, and in the traditional norms of Yoruba music a high value is placed on the upper male voice. He also incorporated Christian hymns in vocal melodies, Asiko drumming, and Ijinle Yoruba poetic rhetoric. During his time, musicians were not considered to have a respectable profession in traditional Yoruba society. Tunde King often would play music with his face covered by a cap to maintain a level of anonymity and to avoid social stigma. He would perform usually during late-evening sessions at family compounds and never on the streets.

Tunde King and his group were also the first jùjú musicians to be recorded in 1936, by the Parlophone record label. Tunde King said that influential patrons encouraged him to record his songs at a time when only select few groups with strong ties to African elites had access to recording facilities. The elites had the money to buy gramophones to listen to recorded music, which increased the popularity of the musicians they listened to. The elites also gave musicians live performance opportunities. The few jùjú bands that are widely known across Nigeria and other specific regions usually gained recognition from performing at high-profile events and celebrations of the elites. Tunde King talked about how his earnings from recordings were minuscule compared to his earnings from live performances. Musicians who did not have the opportunity to record were trapped in a cycle of no elite contacts, no recordings, and no chance for upward mobility.

Tunde King's group laid the foundation for what would later evolve into jùjú music. They blended Asiko rhythms, socially reflective themes and some western instruments, making a significant impact on Nigerian music history.

== Performance contexts ==
Jùjú music is performed primarily by artists from the southwestern region of Nigeria, where the Yoruba are the most numerous ethnic group. In performance, audience members commonly shower jùjú musicians with money, a tradition known as "spraying." "Spraying" involves a pleased recipient dancing toward the bandleader or another musician and attaching money to the sweat on the musician's forehead. The band manager will then go around collecting the money, placing it in a cardboard box on the bandstand. This commonly serves as a primary source of income for musicians. Some other sources of income include cash advances and record royalties.

Performances of jùjú music often alternate between concerted choral and call-and-response singing.

The three main contexts for jùjú music in the 1930s/1940s were parlour parties, urban bars, and neo-traditional ceremonies. Other performance venues include house parties, naming ceremonies, weddings, and wakes.

Most jùjú musicians are based in "the zone of market forces," such as Ibadan. There are several contexts in which jùjú music is performed, such as hotels, nightclubs, and universities. Most activity takes place after nine p.m., and the hotels are the center of Ibadan's economic structure. Jùjú performances often lasted for hours without any breaks and there were often competitions between local groups. Bands often had a large repertoire of songs that they would play from memory. The bandleader of the group was responsible for evaluating how the crowd was feeling and adjusting their performance to the audience's preferences. When performing in ceremonies, they had to be familiar with traditional verbal genres and the life histories of any ceremonial participants.

The bandleader could signal the band to change course using different signals such as verbal phrases, changes in melodic patterns on the banjo, and by using drums as surrogate speech (imitating tones) to comment on the performance. Whether on or off the stage, the bandleader was expected to be energetic, dignified and generous. If an argument were to break out among celebrants, he was expected to mediate it effectively. The ideal bandleader has a clear and strong voice. The bandleader is ultimately responsible wherever the band plays and whether the event is a success or failure. Tunde King talked about how his band was sometimes asked to play all night, and he was able to play for four hours at a time without stopping. Jùjú bands also dress colourfully and neatly, and usually have a good sound system so that the drumming and praise lyrics can be heard clearly by everyone.

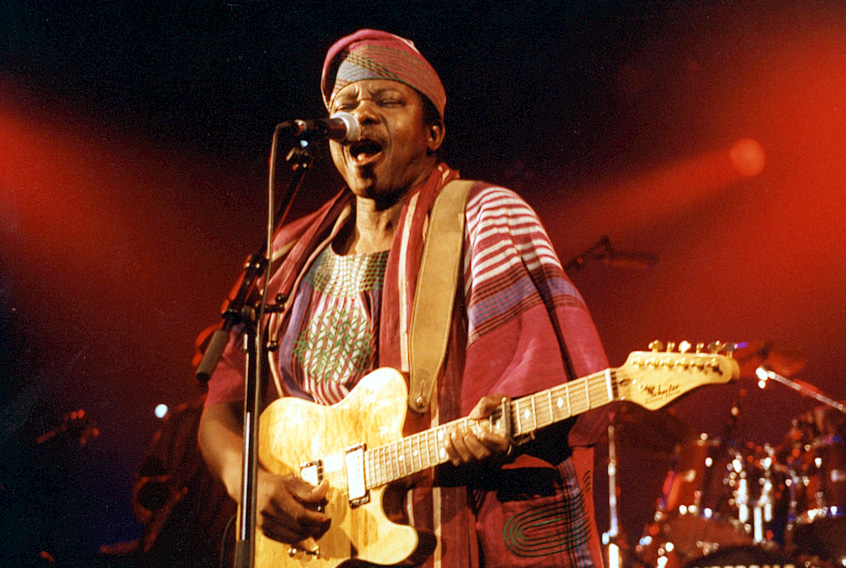
Jùjú artist Sunny King Ade

There was a nocturnal sub-culture that developed in Lagos, where jùjú music was played and performed mostly during the night. Even the most successful jùjú musicians often had an ambiguous status. The nighttime was known to be a time of uncertainty in Yoruba traditions. Spirits and witches are known to be most active at night, and respectable families would tightly shutter their houses. Many musicians would tell stories of strange things happening on their way to or from nocturnal performances. Jùjú artist Tunde King even wrote some lyrics talking about the night. Musicians would also use their cigarette smoke to make a protective aura.

Another context in which jùjú music is played is at celebrations called àríyá. For example, one jùjú artist named King Sunny Adé performed at àríyá. These celebrations are parties which celebrate the naming of a baby, weddings, birthdays, funerals, title-taking, ceremonies and the launching of new property or business enterprises. Live music is crucial to the proper functioning of an àríyá.

== Musical features ==
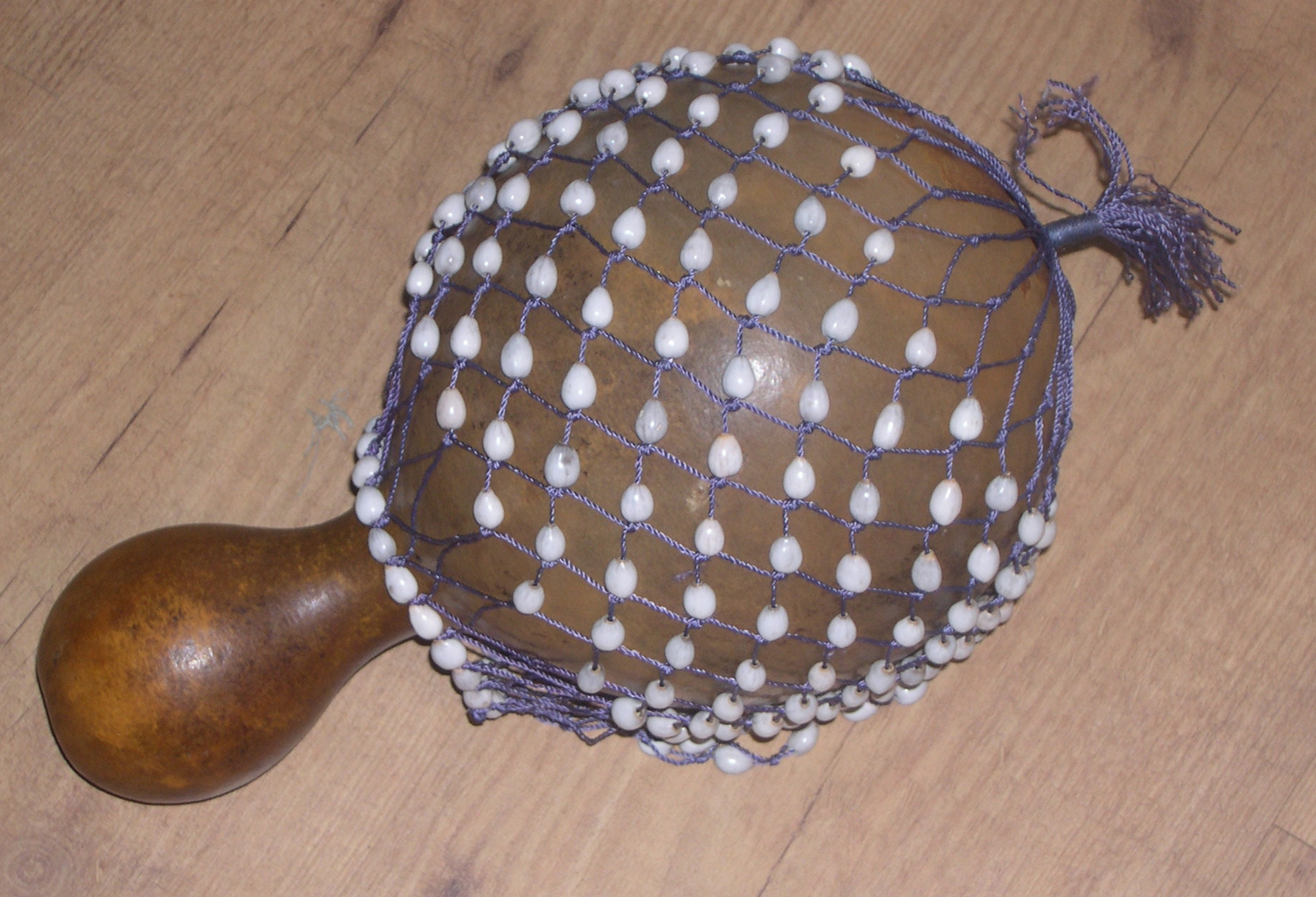
Sèkèrè (Gourd Rattle)

The musical elements of jùjú music include its rhythmic foundations, which often involve complex rhythms like polyrhythms. Early jùjú music usually had a tempo between 130bpm and 150bpm, which was considered fast for most traditional Yoruba social dance drumming at the time.

Percussion instruments include the jùjú drum (tambourine), talking drum (gangan), sèkèrè (gourd rattle), agidigbo (type of xylophone) and guitar (plays both lead and rhythm roles).

Early styles of jùjú consisted of acoustic guitar or banjo, drums, sèkèrè (gourd rattle), tambourine, vocals (call and response, harmonies, repetitive refrain). Polyrhythmic percussion is more of an essential element in modern jùjú, along with other instruments such as electric guitars, synthesizers, pedal steel guitars, talking drums, and sometimes saxophones.

Melodic and harmonic elements include a call-and-response structure, improvisation, harmony, and an expressive vocal style. Melodies were mostly diatonic and harmonized in parallel thirds, which is common in Christian musical practice. Jùjú was usually harmonized by a I-IV-V7 pattern, and early jùjú was structured as A-B-A or A-A-B-A, known as the "Johnny Walker". Male voices having a high register was placed at a high value and voices were usually slightly nasalized and barely had any vibrato. Oftentimes the banjo would also be used to foreshadow melodies of following vocals.

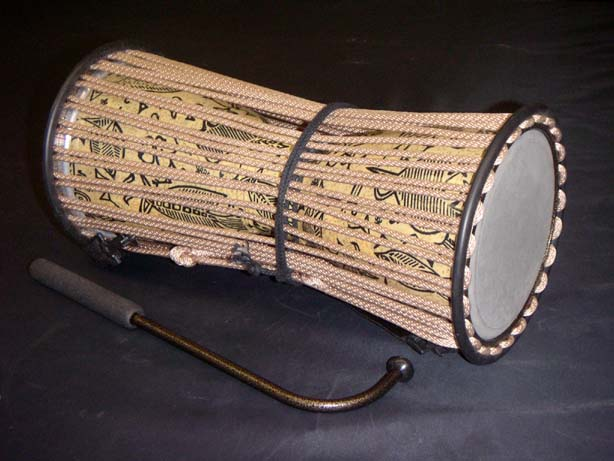
Talking Drum

Jùjú music has been influenced by different musical genres such as rock, funk and reggae.

=== Lyrical content ===
Lyrics include praise singing and storytelling. Lyrical themes include identity, community, life, spiritual beliefs, and social commentary. Jùjú praise lyrics often draw from traditional sources, such as Yoruba proverbs and praise names (known as oríkì). These praise lyrics are usually aimed at an important person at the event, often the host who would have hired the band. The bandleader will sing the main melody, adding personal details about the person that is being praised. These solo lines will alternate will short call-and-response sections sung with the chorus. The talking drum also plays an important role by echoing phrases of praise and proverbs, adding rhythmic patterns that reflect the social atmosphere.

== Notable Artists ==
- Ebeneezer Obey
- King Sunny Ade
- I.K Dario
- Shina Peters

== See also ==
- Music of Nigeria
- List of juju musicians
- Afrobeat
- Femi Kuti
