= List of Nigerian highlife musicians =

This is a list of notable Nigerian highlife musicians arranged in alphabetical order. There are several other genres of music in Nigeria these include Ikorodo, Igbo gospel, Owerri Bongo, Fuji music, Ekpili Jùjú music, Apala, Were music and Highlife. Although Highlife originated in Ghana, the genre has spread across west African countries including Nigeria.

== B ==
- Babá Ken Okulolo
- Bobby Benson
- Bright Chimezie
- Bola Johnson

== C ==
- Chief Stephen Osita Osadebe
- The Cavemenelodie

== D ==
- Dr Sir Warrior

== E ==
- Ebenezer Obey

== F ==
- Fatai Rolling Dollar
- Fela Kuti
- Femi Kuti
- Fela Sowande
- Flavour N'abania

== I ==
- I. K. Dairo

== K ==
- Kabaka

== M ==
- Mike Ejeagha

== O ==
- Orlando Owoh
- Oliver De Coque
- Oriental Brothers
- Osita Osadebe
- Orlando Julius Ekemode

== P ==
- Prince Nico Mbarga

== R ==
- Rex Lawson
- Roy Chicago

== S ==
- Seun Kuti
- Sunny Ade

== U ==
- Umu Obiligbo

== V ==
- Victor Olaiya
- Victor Uwaifo

== W ==
- Wilberforce Echezona

== See also ==
- List of juju musicians
