= Indigenous Nigerian music =

Indigenous Nigerian music is the music originating from the various indigenous tribes of Nigeria. It encompasses mainly traditional music styles, although some forms have absorbed partial influences from genres performed by immigrant and foreign musicians.

== Traditional forms ==
- Hausa music
- Igbo music (Odumodu, Ogene, Igbo gospel, Ekpili, Ikorodo)
- Yoruba music (Apala, Fuji, Juju)

== Contemporary music ==
These genres have incorporated external musical influences:

- Afrobeat
- Afro-juju
- Igbo Highlife
- Igbo rap
- Waka
- Yo-pop

== See also ==
- Music of Nigeria
- African popular music
