= Igbo ceremonial songs =

Igbo traditional and ceremonial songs

Igbo ceremonial songs are songs and other musical practices performed during ceremonial activities in Igboland. They are associated with social, religious and political events across Igbo-speaking communities. These include birth songs and childbirth performances, marriage songs, funeral songs, masquerade and festive songs. It may be in form of singing, humming, dancing, gestures, instrumental accompaniment, chanting, praises, satire, prayer, and dramatic actions.

== Life-cycles songs ==
=== Birth songs ===
Birth songs are among the best documented forms of Igbo ceremonial songs. Grace Eche Okereke's study of Ututu, in present day Abia State of Nigeria, classifies birth songs into four groups; songs announcing the child and expressing womens joy, songs recalling labour and childbirth, songs addressing the predicament of a childless woman and songs giving thanks to God after a safe delivery.

Irri muo or oro ọnụ is the song used to announce a new birth and the first woman to hear the news will raise an ululation or call by shouting and singing loud for other women to gather. Umanwa, Egwu omugho or Egwu Nwa is the name for childbirth songs. Women usually dance while men generally watch. The performances in this event mainly features womens vocal leadership, ululation, dance, dramatic movement, prayers for the health of mother and child and thanksgiving..

Three weeks after birth which is the twelfth day in the Igbo calendar known as Izu-nato, a naming ceremony is held known as "Iba Nwa Afa" through which the child is incorporated into the community and recognized by his kin group known as "umunna". After the presentation and naming of the child, the women will start singing and dancing while feasting.

=== Marriage songs ===
In Igbo culture, a marriage ceremony called ịgba nkwu is a large event that gathers a variety of marriage songs from the folk tradition as well as songs from both the bride and groom’s families. During the marriage, a particular type of songs is played, which entices all of the guests and relatives to sing and dance. Folk songs will be sung by the bride and groom’s families and friends to represent what is happening and what marriage is all about, with the tune sung in unison.

Marriage songs sung during marriage rituals in Igbo territory have song lines that provide general comments on topics of interest. The majority of these folk-songs are pieces of advice to any new or aspiring partners that may be there. The songs performed during a marriage ceremony, are not just about the married couple but also about the community as a whole. Unity, patience, love, good neighbourliness, and generosity are among the values instilled in these songs. These values in these songs promote societal coexistence that is peaceful and harmonious. In traditional civilisation, Igbo marriage songs play a very important role in marriage counselling, making marriage an interesting subject to study. It gives the bride a good psychological head start in terms of what she might expect in her new marital home. As a result, when the bride subsequently contemplates the songs in her marital home, she is struck by their complexity.

Marriage songs in Igbo society are initiated the first through lullabies. These songs and many other sorts of songs, such as birth songs and death songs, are used in Igbo society as the first vocal art. The maiden folk perform the majority of the Igbo traditional marriage songs. They sing throughout the songs, both congratulation and praise.

Traditional marriage songs are rich materials that tackle gender issues. The Igbo are gender sensitive people; that is why Igbo marriage songs show that a woman is an important person whose superior and subordinate positions should be brought into art. Igbo marriage songs are rich because its message and melody keep it society alive.

One of the song addresses the groom as Ezigbo ogo (dear in-law), and instructs him to take care of the bride. Other songs dramatize consent by asking the bride, groom, parents, age-mates, umuada and the husband’s people whether they agree to the marriage.

=== Funeral and mourning songs ===
Igbo people sing on every occasion and one such occasions is a funeral ceremony associated with death, a phenomenon recognized as one of the major rites of passage to join the ancestors. They sing during burials, wakes and memorial events. It is a performances that express grief, recall of the deceased, offering consolation and encouragement. Funeral songs carry messages that helps in consoling the bereaved, highlighting the archievements of the deceased contemplating generally about life and death. The songs may be performed by groups of men, women and young people, with the lead singers alternating with a chorus. In some occasions, singing continues while the grave is being covered bringing mourners to the realization that the deceased would not be seen again.

The funeral song performance is also affected by the status and social relationships of the deceased. Songs may be selected in relation to the deceased’s achievements, family connections and social position. At wakes, men, women and young people take turns chanting, singing and dancing around the body, with performance continuing after burial.

Traditional funeral songs can be performed alongside Orthodox Christian hymns and choruses. It includes antiphonal performances, code-switching and the adaptation of Christian material within local funeral performances.

A study on the Edda dirge in present day Ebonyi State identifies mourning, historical memory, social criticism, didacticism, spirituality and reflection on life among the functions of funeral poetry and the effects of Christianity and Western education on the performance of these dirges.

== Religious songs ==
=== Purification and ritual songs ===
In Odinani or Odinala; the religious system of the Igbo people, musical practices are performed during rituals and purifications. During rituals like "ikpa alu" or "ikpa aru" which is the purification rite associated with the atonement or cleansing of a person, family or community that has violated or defiled the law of Ala the earth deity with the Ala priest as the mediator. During the ritual, the priest performs incantation and chants pleading with the deity to have mercy on the individual. He also plead for the restoration of harmony between the person, the community and the earth deity, and describes sacrifice and confession to be made.

== Festival songs ==
=== Masquerade songs ===
In Igbo culture, masquerades are known as mmanwu or mmọnwu, masquerade music is known as egwu mmanwu and the performance is called Igba mmanwu. Masquerade performances combine music, song, dance, costume, poetry and dramatic action, but the way of practicing it differs across communities and type of masquerade involved. Performances may be in the night or day, on restricted or open spectatorship with satirical songs, singing, dancing, and musical accompaniment by instruments such as ogene, ekwe, udu, igba, ọja and rattles. Instrumental sound can also be used to announce or accompany masquerade appearances. In Oraifite a village in present day Anambra State, ọtu-ube masquerade uses enenke (horn sound) as its sole musical instrument, and the sound heralds the masquerade's appearance and performance.

In Nsukka, the Ọmabe festival is described as having pre-arrival, arrival, intervening, departure and post-departure phases. It also involves the consecration of instruments, the playing of ayogdi, processions through village squares, coded announcements, singing and dancing. Some masquerade masks carved from consecrated trees and some costumes are purified before and after an outing. A study of female poetic performance in Ọkịja records songs associated with masquerade visits, return journeys, praise, pleas, satire and encouragement. In one example, women sing to thank a host community for kola nuts and alligator pepper. An archival record by a British anthropologist; Northcote Thomas identifies a 1911 Agulu wax-cylinder performance titled egwu mmọnwu. The record notes two masked singers with muffled voices using call and response patterns and coded messaging with no instrumental accompaniment.

An account gives examples of masquerades that perform in the day and night. It noted Ajikwu and Ayaka as night performers while Ijele and Agbogbomuo as day performers. It also describes Ayaka as using satirical songs, Ogbagu as emphasizing singing and dancing with sealed calabash accompaniment, Nne Mmuo as using slow and dignified music, and Ugo as dancing to an Igba-eze rhythm.

=== New yam celebration songs ===
During the of new yam and harvest celebration in Igbo culture known as ịri jị, ịwaji or ịri jị ohụrụ, women dance and sings praises while bringing yam and other gifts to the earth deity as an appreciation for fertility. During this celebration, ufie and opi is used as the musical instrument to praise the deity, it is also accompanied by other music instruments like ekwe, oyo, udu, ikoro and Igba.
