= EPAS =

EPAS may refer to:

== Programmes ==
- European Parliament Ambassador School programme
- EFMD Programme Accreditation System
- Electronic Protocols Application Software

== Other uses ==
- EPAS1
- Vocational School (EPAS) of DYPA
- Extensible Parallel Architectural Skeletons
