= Theresa Onuorah =

Nigerian Igbo traditionalist

- Also known as: Queen Theresa Onuorah
- Born: January 9, 1942 (age 84)
- Origin: Unubi, Anambra State, Nigeria
- Genres: Egedege, igbo cultural Music.
- Occupations: Musician and Dancer

Theresa Onuorah is a Nigerian musician popularly known for her influence to Egedege Dance, the Igbo cultural music.

She was born on 9 January 1942 in Unubi, Anambra state, Nigeria. She is a native of Unubi, Anambra State. She is a highlife musician and dancer, popularly known for being the founder of the famous dance troop Egedege Dance troupe.

In October 2021, she was featured in a song Egedege by Larry Gaaga alongside Flavour N' abania and Phyno .

== Early life ==
Theresa was born on 1942 in Unubi, a town in Nnewi south local government area of Anambra State. Her father was a famous 'Egwu Ekpili' musician and played a significant role in nurturing her passion for music, laying the foundation for her future endeavors. Theresa's passion for music ignited at a young age. As a teenager, she embarked on a performance career, traveling from town to town singing and dancing at local events. By the time she was 20, she already established her platform.

However, her early focus on music left limited time for formal education.

== Career ==
Theresa started singing and dancing at very tender age, however only released her first album at the age of 34. Some of her hit albums are Oba egwu, Onwanwa mu na chimo and Ogene Ekwubego mu na onye ga-agba egbu. In 1985, she formed the Egedege Dance troupe, whose name signifies 'prosperity and courage'. Under her guidance, Egedege Dance became a celebrated brand, synonymous to the Igbo traditional dance.

Her unique sound combines traditional instruments (udu, ekwe), distinctive drumming, call-and-response vocals and captivating storytelling.

She is a frequently invited to perform at weddings, festivals and funerals. She transformed Egedege from a regional tradition into a nationally celebrated art form.

== Discography ==
=== Albums ===
- Onye Akpala Aku Nnadi Ga Eli (2019)
- Egedege (2021)

=== Singles ===
- Egedege (2021)
- Egwú ndị Eze (2017)
- Ugochi Nyerem (2017)
- Ojemba Enwilo (2017)
- Onwunwa Munachi (2017)
- Ekene Dili Anambra Na Imo Medley
- Nye Bere (2019)
- Onye Ejila Ihe Uwa Gwa Medley
- Ijerem Irue Medley
- Egedege (featured Larry Gaaga, Flavour, Phyno, Pete Edochie, 2021)
- Obodo (featured Larry Gaaga, Flavour and Phyno, 2024)

== See also ==
- Egedege Dance
