= Igbo highlife =

Regional subgenre of highlife

- Stylistic origins: Highlife; Igbo traditional music
- Cultural origins: 1950s, Biafra/Nigeria
- Typical instruments: Guitar (esp. fingerstyle); horns; vocals; brass; drums

Subgenres
- Ikwokirikwo; Owerri Bongo

Fusion genres
- Igbo rap; Ogene

Other topics
- Igbo highlife musicians; Igbo culture

Igbo highlife is a contemporary musical genre that combines highlife and Igbo traditional music. The genre is primarily guitar-based music, with a rare characteristic blend of horns and vocal rhythms. Igbo highlife lyrics are sung mostly in Igbo with occasional infusion of Pidgin English. One of the most influential composers and performers of the music is Chief Stephen Osita Osadebe whose career spanned over 40 years. Osadebe's discography comprises numerous popular songs including the 1984 hit "Osondi Owendi" which launched him on the world stage as a pioneer of the Igbo highlife genre.

Another prominent musician, Singer and guitarist Oliver De Coque is considered "one of the prime exemplars of and chief innovators in contemporary Igbo popular music." Coque was responsible for the increasing popularity of Igbo highlife with a deeper perspective of Igbo sounds being translated on the guitar. Among his best-known hits are "Biri Ka Mbiri", "Ana Enwe Obodo Enwe", "Nnukwu Mmanwu" and "Identity", all of which were largely successful throughout the early 1980s to mid 1990s. Other early performers in the genre who have made significant contributions to its development are, Ali Chukwuma, Bright Chimezie, Dr Sir Warrior, Celestine Ukwu, Nico Mbarga, Oriental Brothers, Gentleman Mike Ejeagha, Isaac Rogana Ottah, Morocco Maduka, Peacocks Guitar Band International and Ikem Mazeli, amongst others.

== Igbo highlife in the 21st century ==
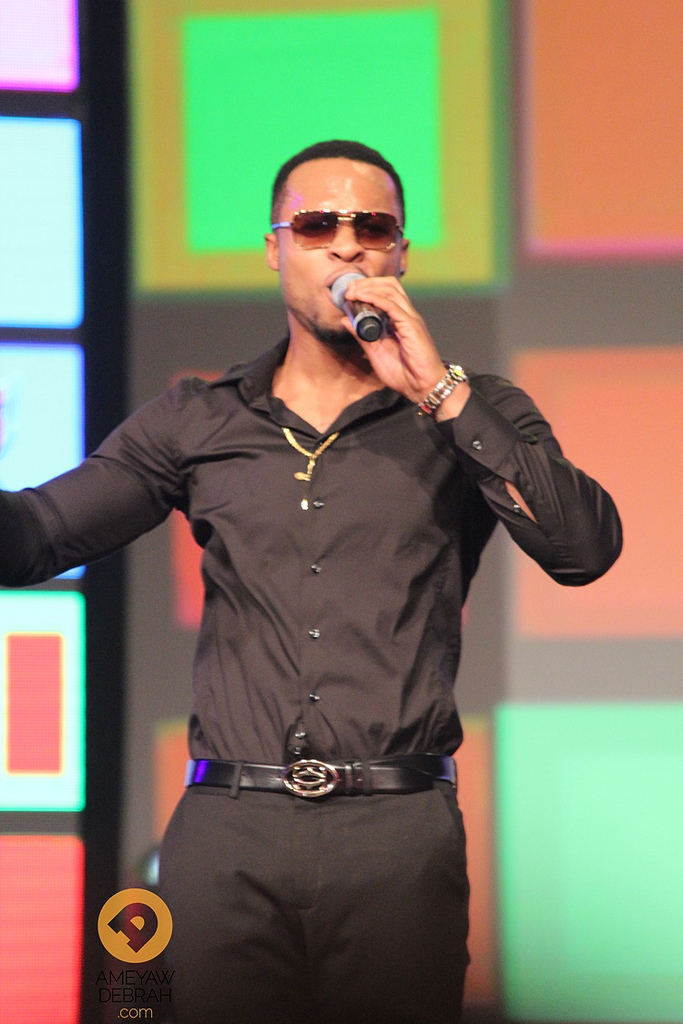
Flavour N'abania performing

From 2004 onwards, singers like Flavour N'abania, J. Martins, Bracket and Wizboyy saw even more success and acclaim for their renascent diverse styles, which, unlike earlier highlife, incorporate a wide range of neoteric influences outside of the West African music scene. One typical example was N'abania's Uplifted album released through Obaino Music/2nite Entertainment in 2010. The album marked a change in musical direction compared to his debut effort as it exhibited a more urban feel encompassing a mixture of hip hop, R&B, techno, reggae, dancehall, and calypso. Uplifted attained commercial success worldwide. In Africa, N'abania remained in high demand at concerts and on other social events.

With the genre's rise in mainstream appeal, many emerging MCs particularly from around the South East and other neighbouring areas began integrating local highlife sounds. Acts such as Mr Raw (formerly Dat N.I.G.G.A. Raw), Slow Dogg, MC Loph and 2Shotz helped establish a much stronger link between indigenous rap, and the new highlife by providing verses to several hit songs and would often hire Igbo vocalists to sing the choruses of their own songs. During 2011, J Martins made headlines around the continent and beyond when he collaborated with Cabo Snoop from Angola and Fally Ipupa from the Democratic Republic of Congo. The songs titled "Good Tym" and "Kele Papa" drew plenty of attention that year, and would later go on to become fan favorites. By 2012, J Martins had evolved into one of the most recognized West African, internationally known music stars. His soukous-tinged approach to record production further gained him additional fan following and respect.

In March 2014, Phyno's introductory album No Guts No Glory was released. Featuring two high-profile appearances by N'abania contributing vocals to tracks "Multiply" and "Authe (Authentic)". The album has received generally positive reviews since its release. It earned Phyno a City People Entertainment Award nomination for Best Rap Album.

== See also ==
- Ikwokirikwo
- Owerri Bongo
- Igbo language
- Igbo people
