= Egedege Dance =

Cultural dance and dance attire of the Igbo people

The Egedege dance // is an Igbo dance from southeastern Nigeria. The modern Egedege dance, which was created in 1985 and popularised by Theresa Onuorah, is an interpretation of an older dance from Unubi, which was performed by youths by moonlight.

The name Egedege stems from local slang for richness and bravery.

== Form and structure ==
The modern Egedege dance combines songs, dance, instrumentation, and colorful traditional outfits. The performance is introduced by elaborate flute playing, which is the entrance cue that heralds the group, led by the queen. Singing begins when the queen reaches the stage and takes the microphone. She arrives under a big umbrella, carried by one man, with another fanning her from behind. She sings but sometimes dance to the rhythm of the instrument.

The leader of the Unubi Egedege dance group is Theresa Onuorah. She is the chief vocalist and is sometimes supported by backup singers.

The dance became popular with audiences via their hit singles, live performances, originality and showmanship in important occasions from the 1980s onwards and has been renowned by the royal-like representation display by the lead singer.

The dance's tempo matches the music, which is dependent on the beat of the ogene, a metal gong instrument, udu, ekwe, flutes, and other local instruments. In recent times, more artists have variation of the dance with a common traits of heavy traditional royal costumes. The lyrics of the songs both entertain and address social issues.

== Performance ==
The Egedege dance is performed mainly at Igbo cultural festivals and high-profile events. Sometimes the dance is performed, during funerals, marriage ceremonies, or official government occasions.

== Costumes ==
The queen is dressed in an expensive and elaborately designed and decorated robe, held at the waist by ten strings of beads. Her crown is of bronze, overlaid with ostrich feathers. Many more beads adorn her neck. In her hands, she holds a horsetail and a bronze staff. The dancers and instrumentalists are dressed uniformly in raffia waist shrouds and arm bands, calf and ankle jingles, bead necklaces, and red ribbons around their heads. The major overall color impressions are red and white.
