= Salawa Abeni =

Nigerian singer (born 1961)

Salawa Abeni Queen of Waka
- Born: Salawa Abeni Alidu; 5 May 1961 (age 65); Epe, Lagos State, Nigeria
- Genres: Waka music
- Occupation: Musician
- Years active: 1975–present
- Labels: Leader records, Kollington, Alagbada

Salawa Abeni Alidu (born 5 May 1961) is a Nigerian singer. An Ijebu Yoruba from Ijebu Waterside, in Ogun State, she began her professional career in waka music when she released her debut album titled, Late General Murtala Ramat Mohammed, in 1976, on Leader Records. It became the first recording by a female artist in Yoruba Songs to sell over a million copies in Nigeria.

Abeni continued recording for Leader until 1986, when she ended a relationship with the record label's owner, Lateef Adepoju. She married Kollington Ayinla and joined his record label instead, staying with him until 1994.

She was crowned "Queen of Waka Music" by the Alaafin of Oyo, Oba Lamidi Adeyemi in 1992. Waka is an Islamic-influenced, traditional Yoruba music style, popularized by Batile Alake; it is a much older genre than jùjú and fuji.

== Controversy ==
When speaking to the News Agency of Nigeria, Abeni created controversy when she advised fellow musicians to "stay away from homosexuality", likening it to drug addiction. Activists called her comments "a display of ignorance", however her remarks were recently echoed by Nigerian model Olajumoke Orisaguna in her YouTube video Olajumoke Sauce 7: Trends and Acceptance uploaded in February 2018. Under Nigerian law based on British colonial jurisprudence, same-sex relationships between LGBT people remain a criminal offence, with maximum punishments ranging from 14 years imprisonment to a death penalty.

== Discography ==
- Gentle lady
- Late Murtala Muhammed (Leader, 1976)
- Iba Omode Iba Agba (Leader, 1976)
- Shooting Stars (Leader, 1977)
- Ijamba Motor (Leader, 1978)
- Okiki Kan To Sele/Yinka Esho Esor (Leader, 1979)
- Orin Tuntun (Leader, 1979)
- Irohin Mecca (Leader, 1980)
- Ile Aiye (Leader, 1980)
- Omi Yale (Leader, 1980)
- Ija O Dara (Leader, 1981)
- Ikilo (Leader, 1981)
- Enie Tori Ele Ku (Leader, 1982)
- Challenge Cup ’84 (Leader, 1983)
- Adieu Alhaji Haruna Ishola (Leader, 1985)
- Indian Waka (Kollington, 1986)
- Ìfẹ́ Dára Púpọ̀ (Kollington, 1986)
- Mo Tun De Bi Mo Se Nde (Kollington, 1986)
- Awa Lagba (Kollington, 1987)
- Abode America (Kollington, 1988)
- Ileya Special (Kollington, 1988)
- I Love You (Kollington, 1988)
- We Are The Children (Kollington, 1989)
- Maradonna (Kollington, 1989)
- Candle (Kollington, 1990)
- Experience (Alagbada, 1991)
- Congratulations (Alagbada, 1991)
- Cheer Up (Alagbada, 1992)
- Waka Carnival (Alagbada, 1994)
- Beware cassette (Sony, 1995)
- Live In London ’96 cassette (Emperor Promotions, 1996)
- Appreciation cassette (Sony, 1997)
- With Barrister Evening Of Sound cassette (Zmirage Productions, 1997)
- Good Morning In America (Alagbada, 1999)
