= Igbo music =

Musical traditions of the Igbo people

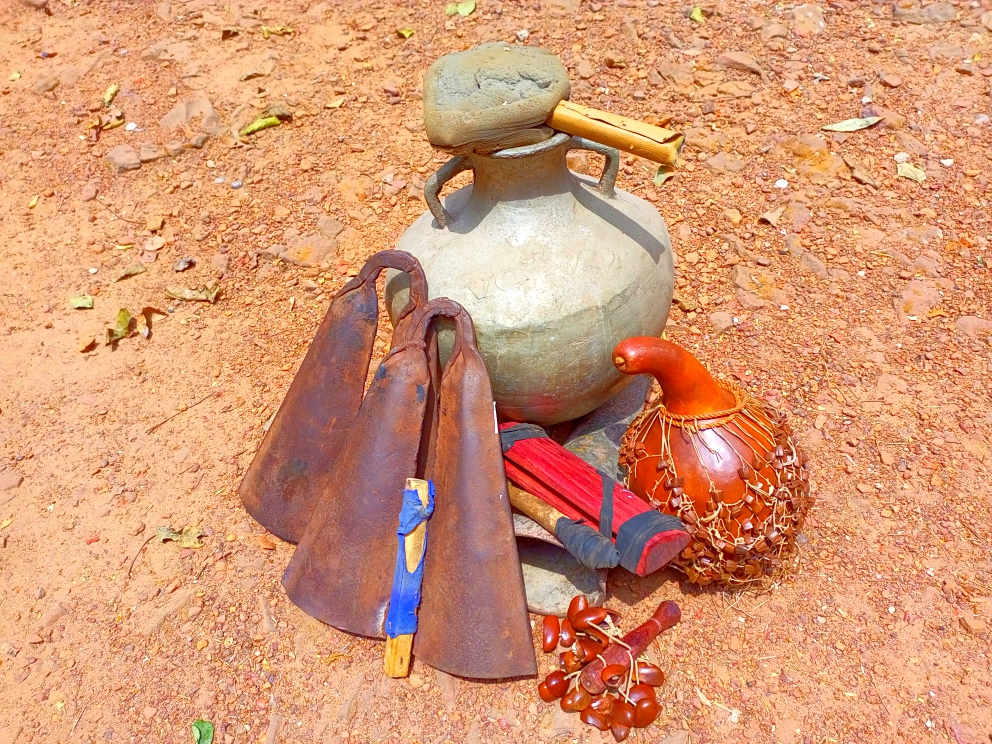
An ensemble of Igbo instruments, including an udu pot drum, an ichaka rattle, an ogene gong and an ekwe slit drum

Igbo music (Igbo: Egwu nkwa ndi Igbo) is the music of the Igbo people, who are indigenous to the southeastern part of Nigeria. The Igbo traditionally rely heavily on percussion instruments such as the drum and the gong, which are popular because of their innate ability to provide a diverse array of tempo, sound, and pitch.

Igbo music is generally lively, upbeat, and spontaneous, which creates a variety of sounds that enable the Igbo people to incorporate music into almost all facets of their daily lives. Some very popular Igbo musical styles are Igbo highlife, Ogene, Igbo gospel.

== History ==
When examining the impact that music has on the culture of the Igbo people, one would have to look no further than the earliest accounts of the vast history of the Igbo in Nigeria. Igbo people are speculated to be descendants of the people of the Nok culture that a large area of central Nigeria from 1500 BC to 200 AD. The Nok civilization is very popular because of the vast amount of colorful artifacts that they left behind, which include an array of musical instruments some of which on surface examination are somewhat similar to those found in Igbo Ukwu. It is not known when the beginnings or first vestiges of Igbo music sprung up. However, from the range of traditional lullabies, rhythmic proverbs and poems, work songs and general use of music in day-to-day life, music has influenced.

=== Cultural impact ===
Traditionally, music has been used to:

- Enhance celebrations, such as during the New Year, weddings, birthday parties, childbirth and naming ceremonies
- To bring about a historically sacred ambiance at church services, funerals, and eulogies
- For pleasure, such as when lullabies are sung by parents to their children
- For sports and labor
- To guide historians as they recount stories

== Instruments ==
=== Drums ===
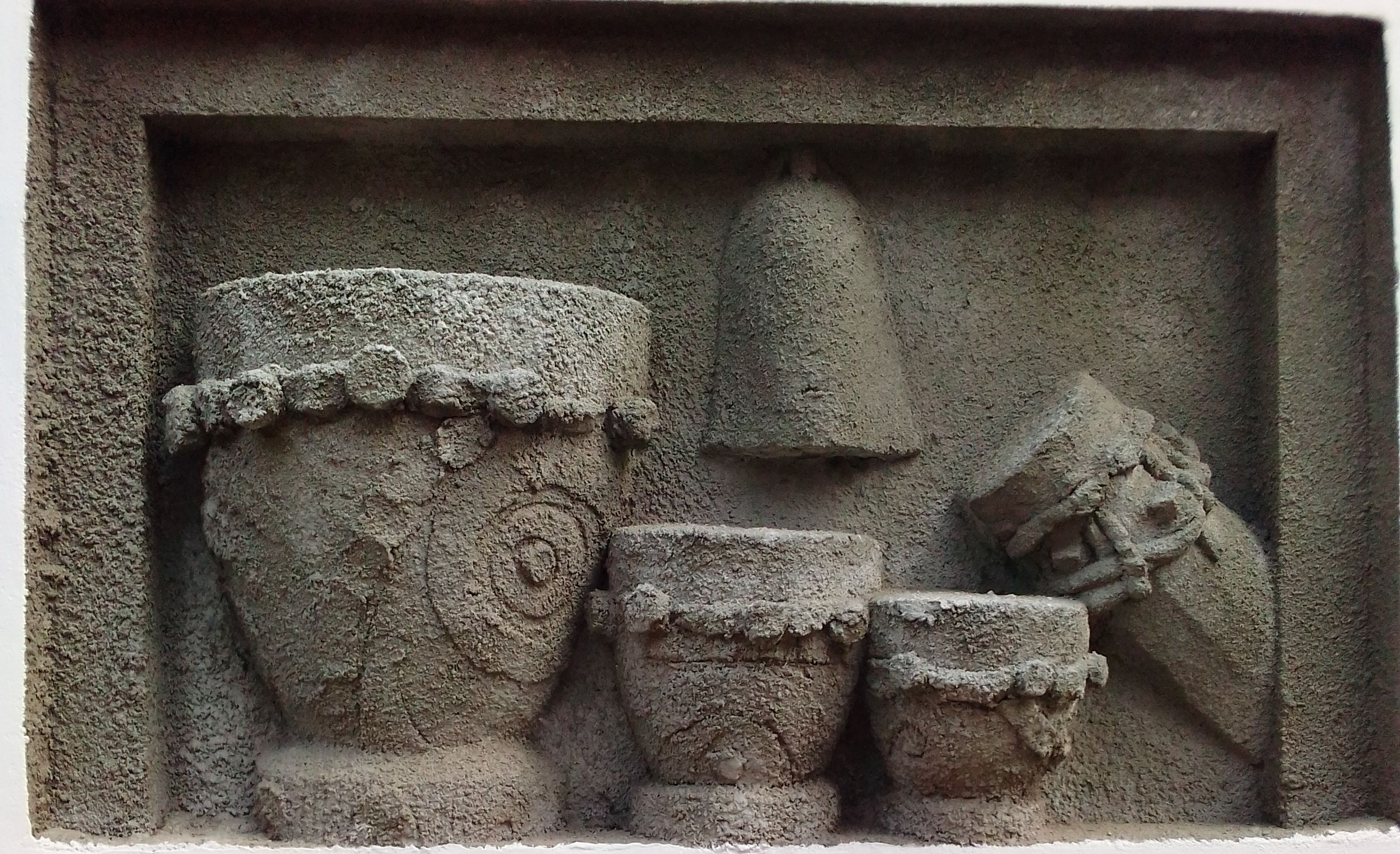
Several igba drums with an ogene gong

The drum is the most important musical instrument for Nigerians, and especially the Igbo people. This instrument is extensively used during celebrations, rites of passage, funerals, war, town meetings and an array of other events. Since this instrument is so diverse, many types of drums have been crafted and perfected over the years.

==== Pot drum ====
The pot drum instrument is called the Kim-Kim or Udu. It is typically dumb-bell shaped, and is around 27 cm–29 cm in height with an opening at the top that is about three to five centimeters. The base of the drum is about 13 cm–15 cm wide, and the head is around eight to nine centimeters wide. This instrument is typically used to produce bass. To achieve a low and deep sound, a minimal amount of water is added. To maintain a higher sound, a considerable amount of water is added to the pot. To play this instrument, the musician will brace it between her legs and grip the neck with her left hand. In order to produce a sound, the musician will cup her hand and beat the opening very rapidly. Usually, this instrument has been played by women and is used for traditional rites of passage, weddings, and community club meetings.

==== The drum ====
The Udu is the most common and popular drum. This instrument is also known as Nkwa, Egwe, or Egede, depending on the part of the country. These drums are not talking drums. Although they produce a sound which is tonal, syncopated, and generally melodious – they have never been known as talking drums and are not spiritual in nature or usage. Igbo people speak. The body of the drum is usually constructed from a hollowed-out pear or cotton tree, which is very durable yet malleable. The drum is then covered with antelope or cow skin. The hide is fastened tightly to the top and bottom of the instrument with seven to eight studs, and with rope decoratively. The studs are able to be adjusted for tuning purposes and sound accommodation. If the studs are tightened, a high pitch is emitted. The opposite effect is heard if the studs are loosened. Typically, more than one Igba is played by several drummers at a time. The drum can be played by using four fingers from each hand. The right hand is used to beat the head of the drum, and the left hand is used to stop the vibration. If the musician stops the vibration closer to the edge of the drum head, a low pitch will be emitted. If the musician stops the vibration closer to the center, then a higher pitch will be emitted. The Igba can also be played using a curved drum stick, which can be found wrapped in fiber to produce a soft sound, or "naked" to produce a hard sound. This drum is very versatile and is usually played during celebrations, festivals, weddings, male and female rites of passage, and sometimes funerals.

==== Slit drum (Ekwe) ====
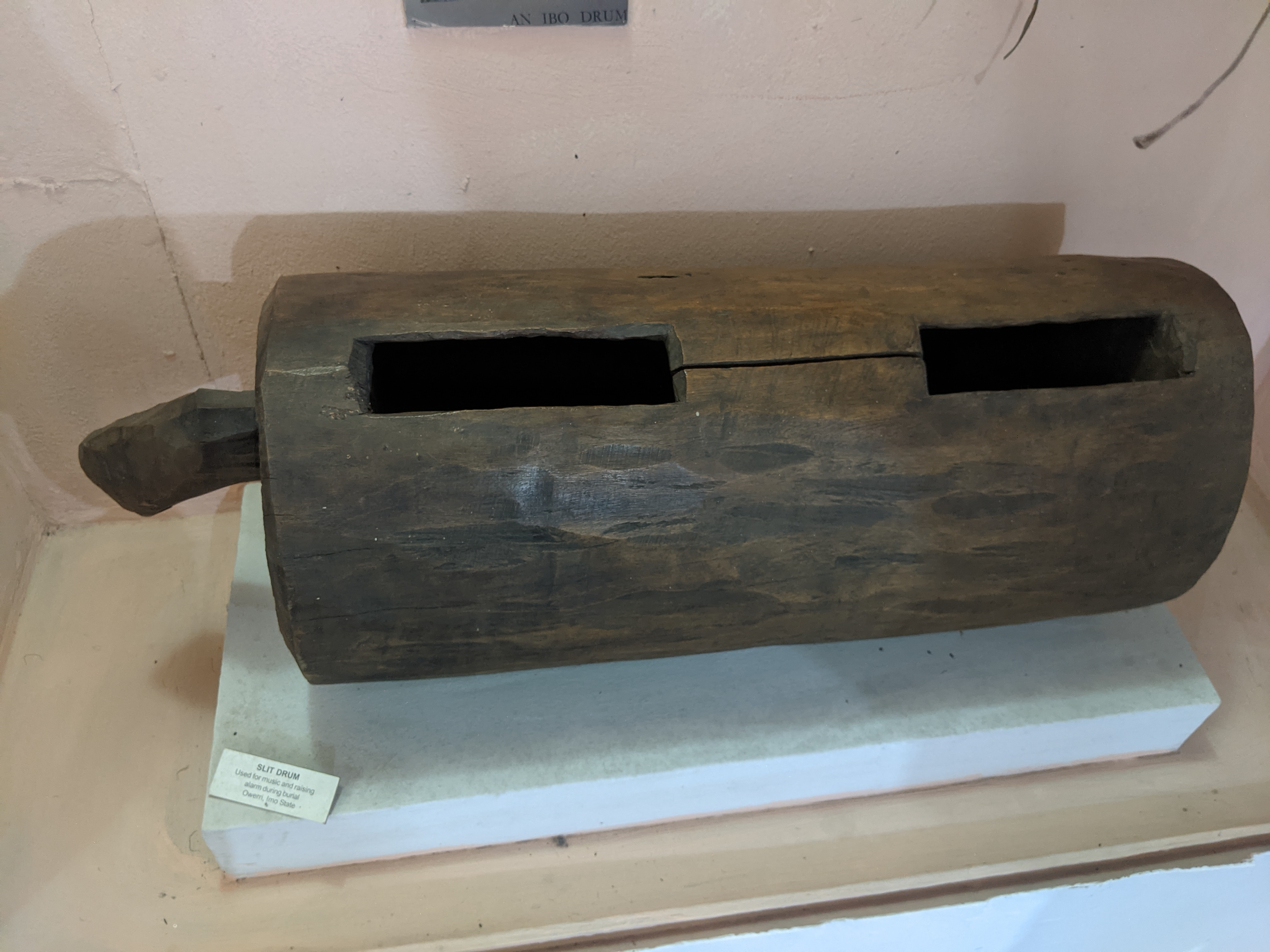
An Igbo ekwe slit drum

The slit drum called the Ekwe is also very popular amongst the Igbo. This drum is constructed from a hollowed-out palm, bamboo, or pear tree trunk. Once the trunk has been cleaned, two horizontal slits are carved into the base, as well as a narrow slit connecting the two. This drum is played using a "naked" wooden drumstick to strike the head. The Ekwe produces a distinct sound and, for this reason, is usually used for signaling an emergency, community meetings, or warning of intruders’ presence.

=== Gongs ===
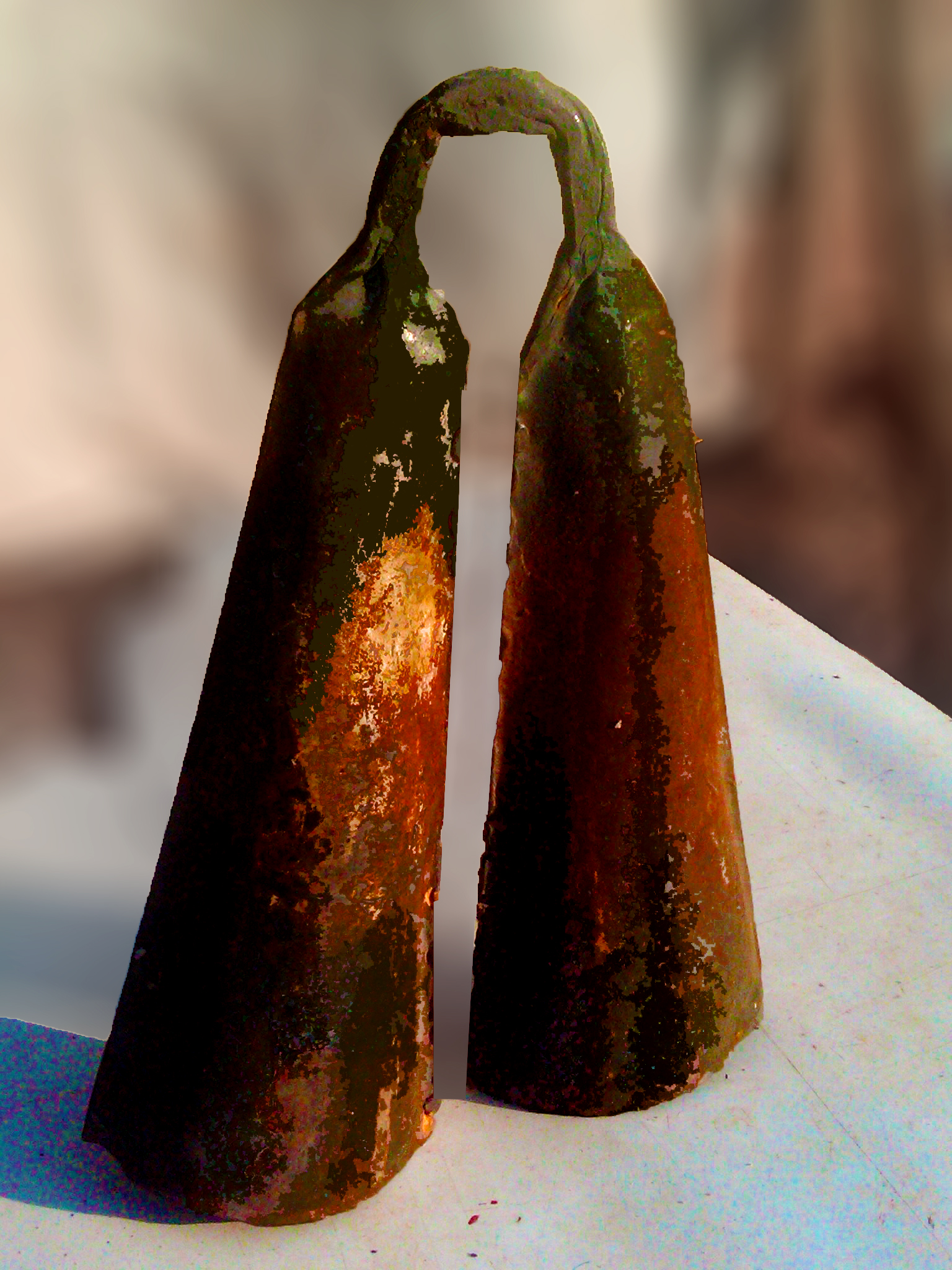
An ogene iron gong

These instruments are another important part of Igbo music. While not as important as the drum, these instruments do provide much-needed rhythm and accompaniment.

The most prominent Gongs are the Olu and the Ogene. The Olu is a large Gong, about four feet long. The Ogene is a smaller Gong and is about eight inches long. The Olu and Ogene are played by rhythmically beating the base of these instruments in cadence with the rest of the ensemble. The Ogene is used mostly for complementing drums and other percussion instruments. It is also very useful in helping dancers time their movements and gestures. The Olu produces a very distinct sound and is mostly used to warn the community of any danger or as a call for attention in case of an important announcement.

=== Other instruments ===
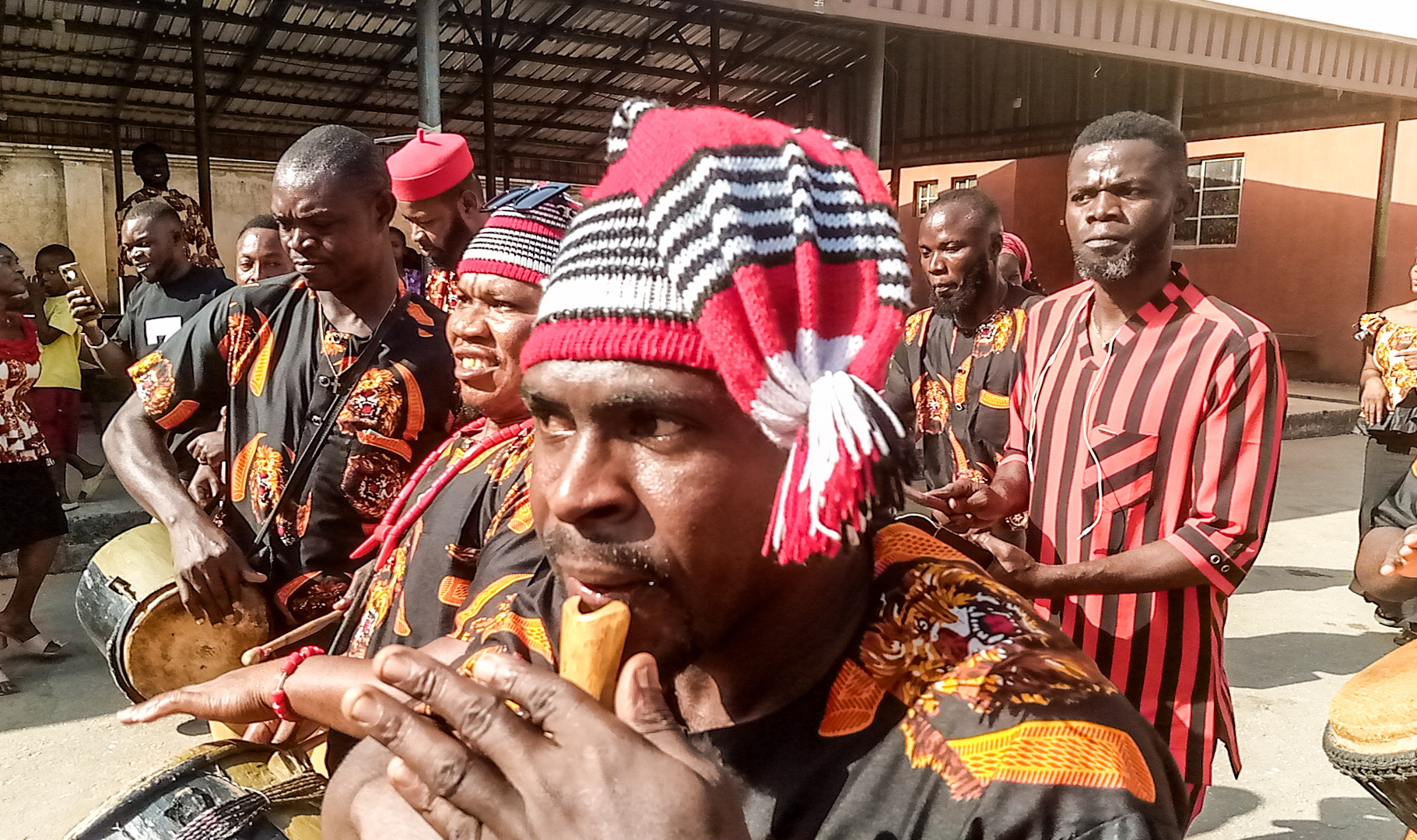
An ọjà player performing with an Igbo cultural group

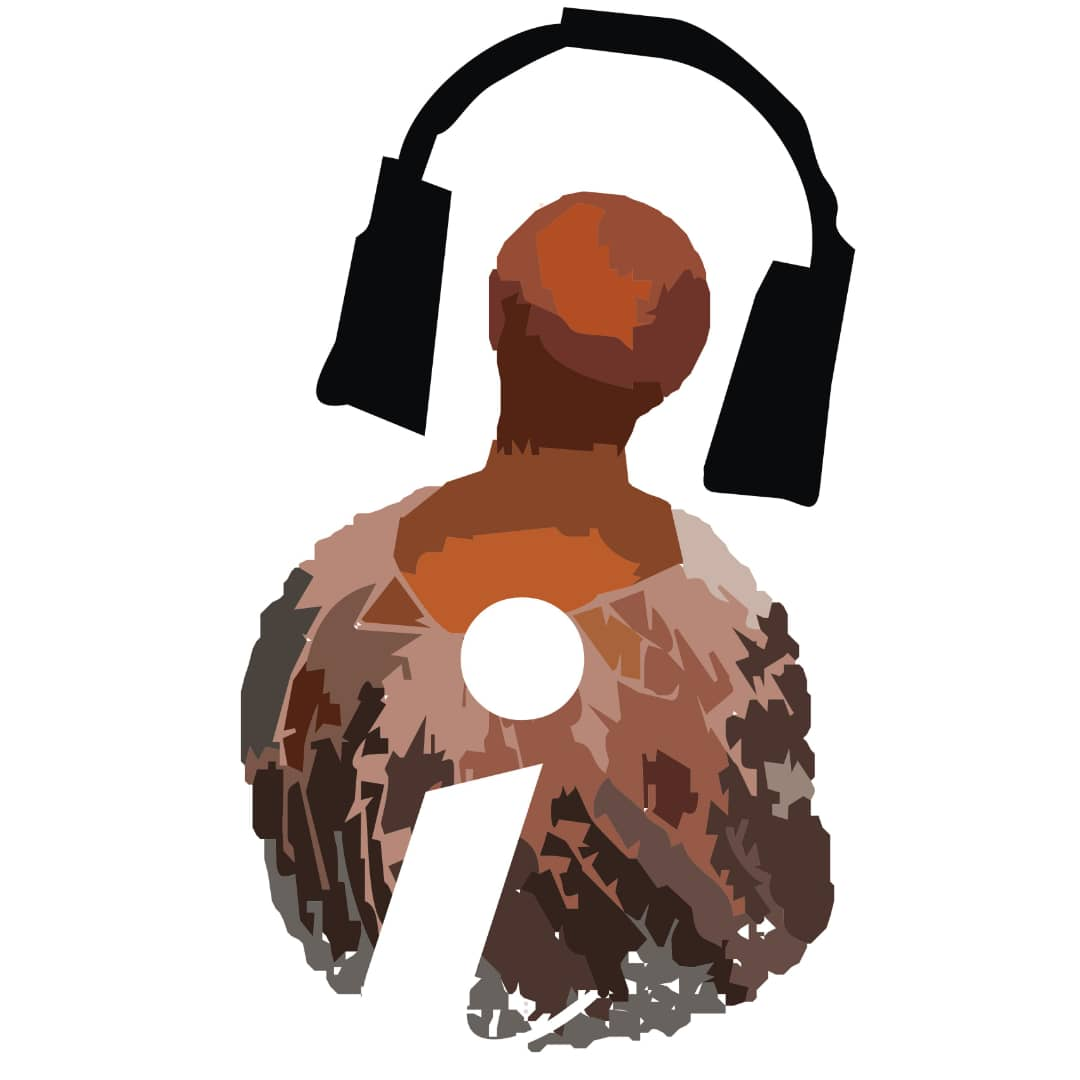
An ichaka gourd rattle

Other instruments include a woodblock known as okpola, a wind instrument similar to the flute, called an Ọjà and the ichaka. The Igbo also have a style of music called Ikorodo, which is when all the musical instruments are played together with vocal accompaniment.

==== Udu ====
The instrument is played by hand and produces a special and unique bass sound by quickly hitting the big hole. Furthermore, the whole corpus can be played by fingers (some experienced players also use toes). Today it is widely used by percussionists in different music styles.

== List of Igbo Genres ==
- Igbo highlife:
  - Ikwokirikwo, Igbo/Owerri bongo, Ikwerre Highlife, Anioma Highlife.
- Igbo rap
- Igbo Folk Music:
  - Odumodu
  - Ekpili
  - Ogene
  - Ikorodo
  - Oja/Egwu Oja
  - Egedege
  - odumodu music
- Igbo gospel
  - ariaria
- Igbo Hymn/Abu:
  - Igbo Anglican Hymns, Igbo Catholic Hymns.

== Today ==
Though Igbo music remains very traditional, it has undergone some changes in old time. In the 60's and 70's, a new genre of music was born called Igbo highlife. This was a fusion of traditional Igbo music and Western African highlife. Igbo highlife and other Igbo rhythm heavily influenced Latin American music. Igbo rhythms have also influenced other musical genres such as gyration music (gyration music is a type of music often used in Nigerian sports stadium anthems and football sporting events) and Nigerian cotemporary music such as Afrobeats.

=== Notable Igbo musicians ===
Some popular Igbo musicians past and present include: Sir Warrior (Head of Highlife), Oliver de Coque (King of Highlife), Celestine Ukwu, Onyeka Onwenu, Chief Stephen Osita Osadebe, Bright Chimezie (Duke of Highlife), Nico Mbarga, Oriental Brothers (Stars of Music), onyeoma tochukwu, Faze, umu obiligbo. For more examples, see List of Igbo people § Musicians.

Some examples of Igbo rappers include Ugoccie, Phyno, Jeriq.
