= Ikwokirikwo =

Igbo highlife style

- Stylistic origins: Ogene music; Traditional Igbo Rhythms; Igbo Highlife
- Cultural origins: 1970s, Southeast Nigeria

Regional scenes
- Nigeria

Other topics
- Owerri Bongo; Ikorodo; Odumodu music; Ekpili

Ikwokirikwo// (Ikwokilikwo) is a high-tempo style of Igbo highlife music influenced by Ogene, which gives the style its fast-paced signature. The style emerged in the early 1970s. It was popularized by the Oriental Brothers and later by Kabaka Guitar Band. It was pioneered by Oliver De Coque and Prince Nico Mbarga.

== History ==
After the Biafran war there was a hunger amongst the Igbo people to move on from the war. Ikwokirikwo came from this desire in the early 70s. Ikwokirikwo was much different from the somber sound of the Igbo highlife music which dominated the era before and presided during the war. The uptempo beat was one which needed the listener to get up and dance. Though Ikwokirikwo is heavily influenced by the ogene music, this style of music also incorporates other Igbo rhythms into the guitar chords. like many other African musical styles of its era It immediately later incorporated other musical styles from other parts of Africa like Benga music, Soukous, Makossa.

In the post-civil war period in Nigeria, Makossa and Soukous music from East and Central Africa were incorporated into Igbo Highlife as a social response to the influx of new music in the civil and post-civil war period in Nigeria (Emielu 2009).

== Etymology ==
The term Ikwokirikwo in Igbo culture is said to be an ancient mythical Igbo dance when a lady lures a warrior with her dance. In terms of Igbo highlife, the first use of the term was by Ikenga Super Stars. They introduced the term in their 1975 album in the track ‘Ikenga in Africa’ in a Sebene-like chant essentially giving the style of music its name.
