= Wilberforce Echezona =

Nigerian musicologist (1926–1987)

Wilberforce William Chukudinka Echezona // (18 August 1926 – November 1987) was a Nigerian musicologist and a pioneer teacher of music in Nigerian universities. He was the first Igbo man to be educated at London's Trinity College of Music, and the first African to obtain a degree in music education in the United States, where he received a PhD from Michigan State University in 1963.

Echezona taught at secondary school level in Nigeria and later at the department of Music at the University of Nigeria. His work included the development and promotion of choral music in Nigeria, including by setting the works of young Nigerian lyricists to music.

== Life and career ==
Echezona was born on 18 August 1926 to the family of Reverend Samuel and Josephine Echezona, his father was from Nkwelle Ogidi in Idemili North Local Government Area. In 1937, he began his secondary school studies at Dennis Memorial Grammar School, Onitsha where he was an organist. Then in 1941, he was briefly an assistant teacher at St Peter's School, Enugu before attending a teachers' training college in Awka, Anambra State. Echezona later worked for a year as a music and mathematics teacher at CMS Grammar School, Lagos.

Echezona earned a licentiate from Trinity College of Music, London in 1948. On his return to Nigeria, he was the director of music of the Niger Diocese of the Anglica Communion from 1950 to 1960. He joined the faculty of University of Nigeria, Nsukka in 1960 as a pioneer music instructor.

Echezona was a member of the committee who selected the Nigerian National Anthem in 1960. In 1967, he manufactured an Ogenephone; an Igbo melodic instrument.

In some of his published works, he wrote on the classification of famous Yoruba and Igbo musical instruments such as the ọjà, agogo and xylophones.

Echezona died in November 1987, at the age of 61.

== Works ==
- Ibo musical instruments in Ibo culture. Thesis (Ph.D.)--Michigan State University, 1963.
- Echezona, W. Wilberforce C. Nigerian musical instruments: a definitive catalogue / W. Wilberforce C. Echezona. Apollo Publishers, c1981.
