= Morocco Maduka =

Nigerian musician

Chief Dr Morocco Maduka
- Born: Chukwuemeka Maduka; April 7, 1944; Dunukofia,Anambra state,Nigeria
- Died: October 29, 2020 (aged 76)
- Known for: Ekpili music
- Spouse: Bridget Ifeonugekwu Maduka
- Children: 8

Chief Dr Chukwuemeka Morocco Maduka (1944–2020) was a Nigerian Igbo Highlife Musician popularly known for his music style Egwu Ekpili, which earned him the title "Eze Egwu Ekpili" (King of Ekpili Music).

He was born on April 7, 1944, Ukwulu, Dunukofia Local Government Area of Anambra State, Nigeria, which is also his ancestral hometown.

== Career ==
He embarked on his music journey at the age of 12. However, his father was initially opposed to his musical pursuits, fearing it would lead to a life of delinquency. Instead, his father had envisioned a more conventional path for him, aspiring for him to become a doctor or a lawyer.

With a career spanning over six decades, Chief Emeka Morocco Maduka released his first album, "Aya Nigeria" (Nigerian War), in 1971, and went on to produce an impressive 120 albums throughout his career. He was still actively making music until his passing, with plans to release a new album and even performing at a historic event to mark his 60 years on stage in 2020.

== Personal life ==
Morocco was married to his wife, Bridget Ifeonugekwu maduka, and together have a family of eight children, consisting of four sons and four daughters.

=== Death ===
He died on October 29, 2020, at the age of 76. His burial ceremony was attended by the former Governor of Anambra state, Peter Obi, Members of Performing Musicians Association of Nigeria PMAN from different chapters and host of other dignitaries who gathered to pay their last respect to the music artist.
