= Peacocks Guitar Band International =

- Also known as: Peacocks Guitar Band, Peacock International, Peacocks Guiter Band
- Origin: Ghana
- Years active: 1970s
- Labels: EMI, His Master's Voice

The Peacocks Guitar Band International was a Nigerian highlife band.

== Background ==
One of the highlights for the group is their musical contribution with the song, "Eddie Quansa". The song ended up being the theme for the sitcom, New Masquerade.

== Career ==
In 1972, the group released their Ejiogu album on the His Master's Voice label. The following year, their Abiriwa album was released on the EMI label.

The Peacocks broke up in 1976 and Dan Orji went on to found the Skylarks Universal Band. He died in 2015.

Along with Chief Osita Osadebe, Fela Anikulapo Kuti, Rex Lawson, Sikiru Ayinde Barrister, King Sunny Ade, Dan Maraya Jos, and Bala Miller, the Peacock Guitar Band International were award nominees in the mid-influencer (the 60s –70s) category for the 2021 Nigeria's Afrobeats Hall of Fame.

== Members ==
- Raphael Amarabem, aka "Ibiso" - Rhythm Guitarist and Vocalist
- Nze Dan Orji - Guitarist
- Okoro Oha Boniface Akagha, aka "Alika" - Bass Player

== Discography ==
=== Albums: songs ===
==== Abiriwa-1973 ====
- Eddie Quansa
- Dan Njemanze
- Jiji
- Iwa Anya
- Jesus christ
- Okpa Aku Eriri
- Egwu Mgbashiriko
- Uba Awuu nwa
- This Girl
- Abasi .O. Mokop

==== 51 Lex Presents: Kinkana Special-2006 ====
- KInkana special
- Umuibe
- Sam Mbiri
- Sa Mbola Mama
- Manu Alunu Nwanneya
- Iga Akwalu Mmi
- Mary Meriamam
- Ebiriye
- Nwa Ibie

==== 51 Lex Presents: Aya Simole-2006 ====
- Aya Simonle
- Oji Onyike Egbu Aruru
- Ezenwata nwannnem
- Batetu
- Enweghi mmanu
- Feresirima
- Nkwo orji
- Onwu Ebeara Igbu Ejiogu
- Odo Biro
- Onye Aghala Nwanneya
