= Odumodu music =

Music genre originating among the Ohuhu subgroup of the Igbo people

Odumodu
- Stylistic origins: Traditional Igbo folk music
- Cultural origins: Eastern Nigeria, Abia state

Other topics
- Ekpili; Ikorodo; Ikwokirikwo; Owerri Bongo

Odumodu// is a folk style of music that is predominantly sung among the Arochukwu, Bende, Ohafia, Abiriba, Umuahia, Ikwuano, and Ngwa people of the Igbo ethnic group, of Abia State, located in southeastern Nigeria. It is mainly used to uplift spirits and entertain guests at events, while extolling the virtues of illustrious men and women, and telling stories that edify.

It is the traditional music played acoustically in live or recorded form at festive events, such as the Ekpe/Okonko (masquerade festival), Iwa akwa (manhood rite of passage), Ichi Echichi (coronation and titling ceremonies), Iza Aha (age-grade maturity ceremony), Ikeji/Iriji (new yam festival), Igbankwu Nwanyi (bridal wine-carrying dance at marriage ceremonies), Igboto Mma (retirement celebration for elderly men), Olili (burial celebration of life), etc.

It is sung by men with syncopating rhythms of chants and harmonized choruses, incorporating traditional Igbo percussions, such as the ekwe/ekere, ikoro, udu, ekpete/igba (congas), ogele (big gongs), oyo, etc. The blending of wise sayings, parables, mystifying hums, and the melodic drumming gives it a captivating feel that encourages the listener to dance in pace with its beats.

Odumodu is usually sung in the call-response style, which features vocals from a lead singer who elicits the response and backing of a group of vocalists, who are often the instrumentalists. Some famous Odumodu artists include Mary Kanu of Atani Arochukwu, Prof Obewe and King Ogenwanne of Ohuhu, Umuahia, Brother Ezeugo of Ogbodi, Umuahia, Ichie Nwamuruamu of Ibeku, Umuahia, and many more.
