= Eugene Skeef =

South African musician and poet

Eugene Skeef FRSA
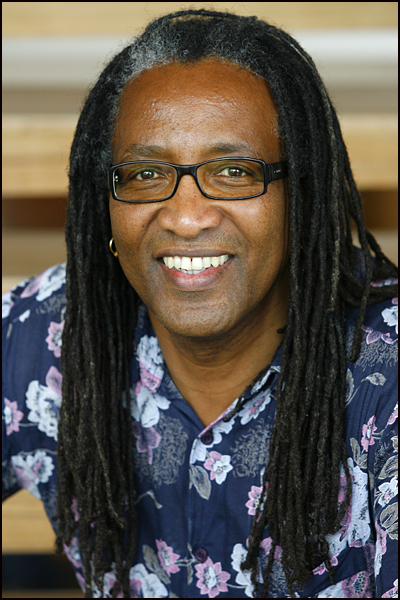
- Born: 1950 (age 75–76)
- Occupations: Percussionist, composer and educator
- Website: eugeneskeef.com/home

Eugene Skeef (FRSA) (born 1950) is a South African-born percussionist, composer, and educator. He has lived in London, England, since 1980 and worked throughout the world. Skeef is a Fellow of the Royal Society of Arts.

== Background ==
Skeef's roots are firmly established in his cultural work with Steve Biko, the late South African civil rights leader. As a young activist, Skeef co-led a nationwide literacy campaign in schools, colleges, and communities across apartheid South Africa.

Skeef collaborates with other artists including Anthony Tidd, Brian Eno, Bheki Mseleku, Tunde Jegede, and Eddie Parker. Skeef has brought his extensive experience as an advisor to the Contemporary Music Network. He has developed the education programmes for some of the major classical orchestras in the United Kingdom, including the London Philharmonic Orchestra (LPO), the London Sinfonietta, and the Royal Scottish National Orchestra.

== Career highlights ==
Skeef is part of the international peace-building initiative called Quartet of Peace, started by Brian Lisus, a South African luthier. He composed "uxolo" (meaning "forgiveness" in the Zulu language), specially commissioned for Lisus's string quartet of instruments in honour of South Africa's four Nobel laureates: Nelson Mandela, Dr Albert Luthuli, F. W. de Klerk and Archbishop Desmond Tutu.

In 2012, Skeef performed at Orchestra In A Field, a classical/popular music cross-over festival situated in Glastonbury Abbey, Somerset. The event was televised by Channel 4.

In June 2008, Skeef and Richard Bissill's "Excite!", an orchestral commission by the London Philharmonic Orchestra, premiered at the Royal Festival Hall at the Southbank Centre, London.

His choral work "Harmony" was performed at Westminster Abbey in March 2007 before the Queen and Commonwealth High Commissioners, to promote global tolerance and understanding.

In the winter of 2006, he was awarded an Arts Council England Fellowship to the Banff Centre for Arts and Creativity in Canada to spend three months developing In Memory Of Our seasons, a multi-media commission from the London Sinfonietta.

In March 2005, Skeef performed with his Abantu Ensemble at Buckingham Palace and was presented to the Queen as part of the historic Music Day to celebrate the diversity of culture in Britain.
