= OPI =

OPI may refer to:

== Organizations ==
- Order of Perpetual Indulgence or Sisters of Perpetual Indulgence
- The Office of Police Integrity, Victoria, Australia

== Science and technology ==
- Open Payment Initiative
- Ocular protection index

== Places ==
- Opi, Abruzzo, a comune in Italy
- Opi (archaeological site), Enugu State, Nigeria

== Other uses ==
- Over the phone interpreting
- Oral Proficiency Interview
- OPI Products, a US nail polish manufacturer
- Opi, an Igbo musical instrument
- Oremus Pro Invicem, Latin for Let us Pray for each other (see List of Latin phrases (O))
