= Celestine Ukwu =

Nigerian singer (1940–1977)

- Born: 1940; Enugu, Colony of Nigeria
- Origin: Abor, Udi LGA, Enugu
- Died: 7 May 1977 (aged 36–37) Owerri-Onitsha Road, Nigeria
- Genres: Igbo highlife
- Occupation: Singer
- Instrument: Guitar
- Years active: 1960s–1970s
- Spouse: Josephine Uzoyibo Okereke-Attah (m. 1976)

Celestine Ukwu (1940 – 7 May 1977) was a Nigerian Igbo highlife musician during the 1960s and 1970s, best known for his hit songs "Ije Enu", "Igede" and "Money Palava". Described as a "prolific and outstanding composer" by music critic Benson Idonije of Radio Nigeria Two, Ukwu's works have been featured on various world music compilations including The Rough Guide to Highlife and The Rough Guide to Psychedelic Africa.

== Early life ==
Ukwu was born in Enugu, the capital city of Enugu State in southeastern Nigeria, and raised in Abor, located in the Udi Local Government Area of Enugu State. His father was a local performer of the igede, ikpa and ode genres of Igbo music while his mother was lead singer in a women's musical group. He learned to read music and play the harmonium through his uncle, a choirmaster, with whom he would frequently travel.

He briefly attended primary schools in the locales they lived in, namely Onitsha, Port Harcourt, Igbariam, and Buguma, and completed his primary education in Abor in 1955. He spent the next three years at the Teacher Training College in Zaria, where in 1958 he would obtain his teachers’ grade three certificate and begin teaching.

== Music career ==
Ukwu left teaching for Enugu in 1962 to join Mike Ejeagha's group Paradise Rhythm Orchestra as a vocalist and maraca player. He would later learn the odo (xylophone) which would become integral to his style. He would then join Mr. Picolo's band, who were touring the Democratic Republic of the Congo at the time of his debut.

He returned to Nigeria and played with Herbert Udemba and his African Baby Party. Three months later, he formed the Freedom Jazz band in Maiduguri, only to move to Zaria with Charles Jebba to form The Republican Knights. He moved again to Onitsha, where he fronted the Niger City Starlighters. Several of their early recordings, such as "No Condition is Permanent," "Artificial Beauty," "Appolonia," and "Ije Enu" saw local success.

After nine months, he regrouped his band, renaming it Celestine Ukwu & His Music Royals of Nigeria. He played regularly at the Frontline Hotel, whose owner Mathias Okafor rented instruments for him. He would disband the group in 1967 following the outbreak of the Nigerian Civil War, before releasing a patriotic song at the outbreak of the war titled "Hail Biafra".

After the end of the war in 1970, he would assemble another band, Celestine Ukwu and the Philosophers National, who would release their debut album True Philosophy the following year. His lyrics, often carrying themes of wisdom and philosophy, put many who had been bereaved or displaced as a result of the civil war to ease.

== Celestine Ukwu and The Philosophers National ==
Celestine Ukwu released seven albums and over forty songs with his band. The band members were:

- Anthony Mogbo (aka Buzuzu) - vocalist
- Emma Ikediashi - lead guitar
- Harry Mosco Agada - lead guitar (composer of "Sugar Cane Baby")
- Goddy Oku - lead guitar
- Paul Adis - rhythm guitar
- Dennis Akwa - rhythm guitar
- Didi (from Cameroun) - bass
- Joe Igbokwe - saxophone, trombone
- Roxy Edet - trumpet
- Joe Ibeto - saxophone
- Walter Igbodo - tenor saxophone, bandleader
- Goddy Eze - clarinet, saxophone, flute
- Jacob Okii - maracas
- Blessed Bazima - congas
- Bolingo - congas
- Black Shadow - congas
- Goddy Odinkemere - drummer
- Ferdy Ohans - drummer

== Personal life ==
Celestine Ukwu married Josephine Uzoyibo (née Okereke-Attah) Ukwu in 1976. His daughter, Cynthia Chikwado Ada Ukwu, would be born seven months after his death.

== Artistry ==
His songs were primarily composed in the Igbo language, with some in Efik. Ukwu's lyrics were often embedded with attitudes critical of materialism and rash behaviour. In a 1986 issue of Nigerian periodical ThisWeek, a columnist remarked that his music "gave a food for thought to its listeners".

Dr. Ikenna Emmanuel Onwuegbuna, a lecturer in the music department of the University of Nigeria, said this of Ukwu's work in his journal article "Celestine Ukwu—the Music, the Message, the Man":

The pioneering highlife works of Celestine Ukwu frequently carry resonant social messages alongside their artistic innovations. His lyrics convey philosophical depth and social awareness by tackling themes aimed at bettering society and humanity itself. The works are permeated with Igbo cultural identity and traditions. Both the style and philosophical messages of his songs strongly reflect the values and worldviews of his ethnic background. Several resonant themes emerge that demonstrate this deep connection.

Egalitarianism is a prime Igbo principle showcased in Ukwu's music. In the song Grade by Grade, he espoused the spirit of equality, industry, and destiny being in one's own hands rather than determined by fate or birth right. This aligns with the Igbo cultural emphasis on achievement through hard work. Similarly, Ukwu levied trenchant criticism against materialism in songs like Ego Eju Aka, which condemn the unbridled accumulation of wealth for its own sake. Such greed is anathema to the Igbo communal system based on sharing resources. By highlighting these tensions, Ukwu's lyrics provide social commentary on the changes affecting post-civil war Igbo society.

The transience of life is another theme the song Ije Enu touchingly addresses, reflecting Igbo philosophical views about the uncertainty of existence and constant flux. Other songs imprint Igbo wisdom and identity by incorporating folk musical styles and lyrics pondering metaphysical questions about human nature.

Ukwu boldly addressed specific societal issues as well.

== Death ==
On May 7, 1977, Celestine Ukwu and his friend Alexander Nwobodo were traveling to Ihiala in Nwobodo's newly-purchased car, when they were hit by a trailer near Owerri Road in Ogidi. Both men would die at the hospital from their injuries.

== Discography ==
=== Albums ===
Albums
Title	Album details
True Philosophy	Released: 1971; Label: Philips; Formats: LP
Tomorrow is so Uncertain	Released: 1973; Label: Phillips; Formats: LP
Ndu Ka Aku	Released: 1974; Label: Philips/Phonogram; Formats: LP
Ilo Abu Chi	Released: 1974; Label: Philips; Formats: LP
Ejim Nk'onye	Released: 1975; Label: Philips/Phonogram; Formats: LP
Igede Fantasia	Released: 1976; Label: Philips; Formats: LP

=== Singles ===
Singles
Title	Single details
Hail Biafra	Released: 1967?; Label: Niger Phone; Formats: Unknown
Igede 1	Released: 1970; Label: Philips-West African Records; Formats: Vinyl, 7", 45 RPM, Mono
Adam	Released: 1972; Label: Philips, Philips-West African Records; Formats: Vinyl, 7", 45 RPM, EP, Mono
Okwukwe Na Nchekwube	Released: 1972; Label: Philips-West African Records; Formats: Vinyl, 7", 45 RPM, Mono
Ejina Uwa Nya isi	Released: 1972; Label: Philips, Philips-West African Records; Formats: Vinyl, 7", 45 RPM, EP, Mono
Onwunwa	Released: Unknown; Label: Philips West African Records; Formats: Vinyl, 7", 45 RPM, Single, Mono
Elege	Released: 1974?; Label: Philips, Philips West African Records; Formats: Vinyl, 7", 45 RPM, Single, Mono
Man Proposes and God Disposes	Released: Unknown; Label: Philips, Philips West African Records; Formats: Vinyl, 7", 45 RPM, Mono
Ilo Oyi	Released: Unknown; Label: Philips, Philips West African Records; Formats: Vinyl, 7", 45 RPM, Single, Mono
Ije Enu	Released: Unknown; Label: Philips, Philips West African Records; Formats: Vinyl, 7", 45 RPM, Single, Mono
Artificial Beauty	Released: Unknown; Label: Philips, Philips West African Records; Formats: Vinyl, 7", 45 RPM, Single, Mono

=== Compilations ===
- His Philosophies: Compilation (1975)
- Greatest Hits (1997)

== See also ==
- List of Igbo people
- Category:Igbo musicians
- Category: 20th-century Nigerian singers
- Category: 20th-century Nigerian male singers
- List of Igbo people
- List of Nigerian musicians
- Rex Lawson

== Bibliography ==
- Richard C. Okafor; Celestine Ukwu (1999). The life and works of Celestine Ukwu Okoye Nzube. New Generation Books. ISBN 978-978-2900-39-5.
