= MC Loph =

- Born: Nwaozor Obiajulu; 1973
- Origin: Umunze, Anambra State, Nigeria
- Died: 14 September 2011 (aged 37–38)
- Genres: Nigerian hip hop, Igbo rap
- Occupations: Rapper, DJ
- Years active: 1990s–2011

MC Loph (1973 – 14 September 2011), born Nwaozor Obiajulu, was a Nigerian rapper and disc jockey known for his contributions to the Igbo rap genre. He rose to national prominence with his remix of highlife legend Chief Osita Osadebe classic song, "Osondi Owendi", featuring Flavour N'abania.

== Life and career ==
MC Loph studied Sociology and Anthropology at the University of Nigeria, Nsukka where he began his music career. He rapped in Igbo and Pidgin English and became a key figure in Eastern Nigeria's hip hop scene.

In 2007, MC Loph gained widespread fame with his remix of Chief Osita Osadebe's "Osondi Owendi", released under EastSyde Records and featuring Flavour N'abania. The song received significant airplay and introduced Igbo rap to a broader national audience.

== Death and legacy ==
MC Loph died in a car crash on 14 September 2011 along the Benin–Ore Expressway in southwestern Nigeria. His sister also died in the accident, while his fiancée, who was pregnant at the time, survived with serious injuries.

He was buried on 28 October 2011 in his hometown of Umunze, Anambra State in a ceremony attended by musicians and dignitaries including then-Governor Peter Obi and economist Chukwuma Soludo.

MC Loph is remembered for fusing traditional Igbo music with modern hip hop. His work helped shape the Igbo rap subgenre. On the fifth anniversary of his death, artists like Phyno and Mr Raw paid tribute to him as a pioneer of Eastern Nigerian hip hop.

== Discography ==
- Osondi Owendi (remix featuring Flavour)
- Albums:
  - Wrekonize
  - Hands Up (EastSyde Records)
