= Kabaka (musician) =

Nigerian highlife musician

- Also known as: Kabaka
- Born: Godwin Opara; Imerienwe, Ngor-Okpala, Imo State
- Occupations: Musician and guitarist
- Instrument: Guitar
- Member of: Oriental Brothers International Band

Godwin Opara, known as Kabaka, was a Nigerian Igbo highlife musician and guitarist. Born in Umuoye in Imerienwe, Ngor Okpala, Imo State, Nigeria, he was nicknamed after the royal traditional title of the king of the Buganda Kingdom in Uganda, Kabaka and was one of the founders of the Oriental Brothers International in 1973 subsequently after the Nigeria-Biafra War.

In 1976, he began his solo career and released a total of 14 studio albums throughout his career.

== Early life ==
Kabaka is the second son of an Igbo family from Umuawara, Umuoye, Imerienwe in Ngor Okpala, Imo State, Nigeria. He studied at Baptist Primary School, Imerienwe. He began playing trumpet during his primary school education. Kabaka left Onitsha for Enugu, where he attended Commercial Secondary School.

== Career ==
Kabaka moved to Lagos in the early 70's, after the Nigerian Civil War. He worked with a local musical group, founded and ran by Mr. Ikediala. While staying at Easygoing Hotel, Kabaka co-founded the Oriental Brothers International, a musical band. They released multiple albums. However in 1976, Kabaka began his solo musical career, founding Kabaka International Guitar Band. He continued to make Igbo Highlife, among others, he released 14 albums including Mangala Special. He also experimented with Ezebongo rhythms to demonstrate his versatility and ingenuity. Later, he collaborated with The Imo City Band, cementing his legacy as a Highlife.

He made a comeback on September 2023 as he unveiled his album The Return Of Kabaka which received over a million streams and ranked in the top albums worldwide.

== Death ==
Kabaka died on March 21, 2024, at the age of 77.

== Discography ==
=== Albums ===
Onye Mam Ka Nma (1980)

- Egbula Nwa Onye Ozo
- Dr Agwu Nwaukpa (Ohaozara Special)
- Onye Mam Ka Nma

Ezi Nwanne (1989)

- Ezi Nwanne
- Uwa Awu Nke Onye
- Osinachi

Izu Kanma Na Nneji (2014)

- Izu Kanma Na Nneji
- Chukwu Kere Mmadu
- Chineke Wetuo Ekwensu
- Mangala Special
- Ichere Chi Amaghi Onye Iwu
- Ajam Ashi-Mi

Abialam (2023)

- Abialam
- Ada Owerri
- Onwu Eme Enyi
- Ebe Onye No
- Ada Ure
- Onwu Eme Enyi
