= Ọjà =

Traditional musical instrument of the Igbo people

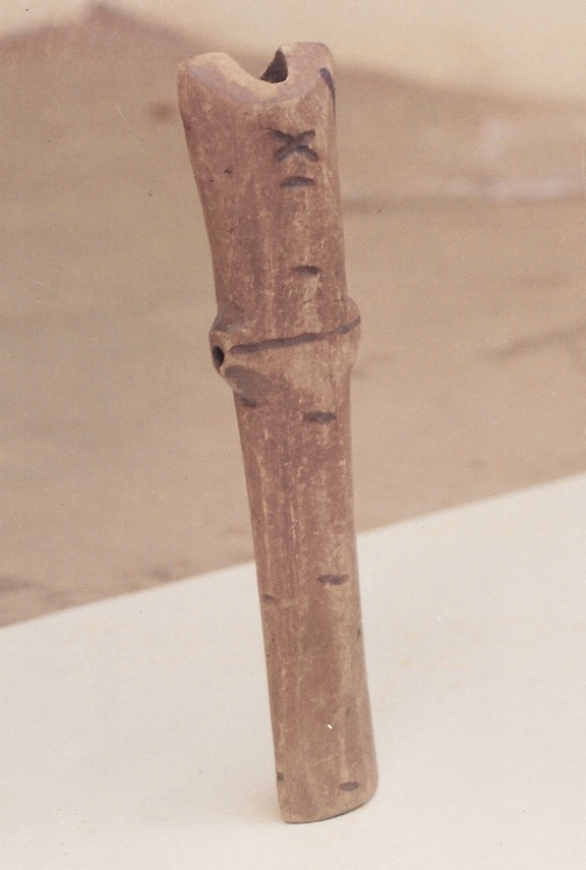
Ọjà

The ọjà (Igbo pronunciation: [ɔ̀d͡ʒà]) is a flute used by the Igbo people of Eastern Nigeria. It is made from bamboo or metal and is played by blowing air into one end while covering and uncovering holes along the body to create different notes. In traditional Igbo music, the ọjà is often performed in conjunction with a number of other instruments such as the ekwe, udu (percussion instrument), igba (drum), ogene (bell), ichaka/0sha (rattle), okwa (gong), etc. The oja is also played to accompany Atilogwu, a traditional dance of the Igbo people.

== Description ==
Ọjà is a highly portable musical instrument, easily transportable and convenient to carry around. This characteristic makes it a popular choice among musicians who perform at various events and ceremonies, both within and outside the Igbo community.

The defining characteristic of the Ọjà flute is its distinct high-pitched sound, which varies among different types of the instrument. This variation in sound is attributed to the size of the Ọjà and the quality of sound produced determines its function within the ensembles of the traditional Igbo music. The smaller instruments produces higher-pitched sounds, the smallest Ọjà discovered to date measures approximately 14 cm in length, while the largest is approximately 26 cm.

== Types of ọjà ==
- Ọjà ukwe: this is also known as the singing flute. It is a type of ọjà that is primarily used in the accompaniment of women's dances of all types. It is characterized by its melodic and expressive sound, which adds to the vibrant atmosphere of the dance performances.
- ọjà mmanwu (Mmanwu music flute): this is the smallest and highest-pitched type of ọjà, is specifically used in the performance of masquerade music. These flutes are typically shorter in length, which contributes to their distinctive high-pitched sound. The ọjà mmanwu plays a crucial role in the musical accompaniment of masquerade performances, adding to the celebratory and festive atmosphere of the events.
- Ọjà igede: is a type of ọjà that is characterized by its low-pitched sound. This ọjà is typically used in pairs, with one ọjà playing the lead melody and the other responding. The Oja igede is typically played in conjunction with the Igede drum, a type of music that is used for burial ceremonies.
- Ọjà-okolobia: this is a type of ọjà that is specifically used in the ceremonies of men who have attained maturity. The Ọjà-okolobia play an important role in the cultural and traditional rituals of the Igbo people, symbolizing the rite of passage into adulthood.

== See also ==
- Flute
