= Waka music =

Islamic-oriented genre of Yoruba music

Waka music is a popular Islamic-oriented Yoruba musical genre. It was made popular by Alhaja Batile Alake from Ijebu, who took the genre into the mainstream Nigerian music by playing it at concerts and parties; also, she was the first waka singer to record an album. Later, younger singers like Salawa Abeni and Kuburatu Alaragbo joined the pack. In 1992, Salawa Abeni was crowned "Queen of Waka" by the Alafin of Oyo, Oba Lamidi Adeyemi.

Waka music has no connection whatsoever with the official song of the 2010 FIFA World Cup called Waka Waka (This Time for Africa) which is a traditional African soldiers' song from Cameroon.

In later days, 90s to be precise, a lot more Musicians with the Quranic front came on board and one to stand out is El-hadj wasiu Kayode Sideeq and his wife hajia Hafsat Sideeq, He is now popularly known as BabaNwaka(father of waka) with the music being islam centered as far back as the times of trade between Mali empire of Mansa Musa of Timbuktu and the Southwestern region of Nigeria, whereby, they brought Islam to the Yorubas from Mali.
