= Electronic Protocols Application Software =

Electronic Protocols Application Software (EPAS) was a European non-commercial cooperation initiative which developed a series of data protocols to be applied in a point of sale (POS) environment. This included the protocols used by payment terminals and card payment systems. The project focused on three protocols; a terminal management protocol, a retailer application protocol and an acquirer protocol.

In 2024, EPAS was merged with two other organizations to create Nexo Specifications.

== History ==
The organization was launched in 2005, and took over some of the work done on payment terminal standards in Germany by the Open Payment Initiative.

The initiative was structured along three following main phases:

- Phase I : development of technical specifications and issuance of standards (2006 - mid-2007)
- Phase II : development of software and provision of test tools (2007 – 2008)
- Phase III : construction of demonstrators (2008)

In 2012, it was merged with the OSCar consortium and the CIR SEPA-Fast technical working group to create a global standards organization called Nexo Standards.

== Participants ==
The EPAS Consortium was composed of 24 organisations.

- Ingenico (FR)
- VeriFone (US)
- The Logic Group (UK)
- Amadis (CA)
- ELITT (FR)
- MoneyLine (FR)
- Lyra Network (FR)
- Atos Worldline (DE)
- Wincor Nixdorf (ES)
- GIE – Groupement des Cartes Bancaires "CB" (FR) (Co-ordinator)
- Desjardins (CA)
- Atos Worldline (BE)
- Security Research and Consulting (SRC) GmbH (DE)
- Equens SE (NL)
- Sermepa (ES)
- Cetrel (LU)
- Total (FR)
- Quercia (IT)
- University of Applied Sciences, Cologne (DE)
- Integri (BE)
- PAN Nordic Card Association (PNC) (SE)
- GALITT (FR)
- BP (GB)
- RSC Commercial Services (DE)
- Europay Austria Zahlungsverkehrssysteme GmbH (AT)
- SIBS (PT)
- Thales e-Transactions España (ES)

== See also ==
- EFTPOS
- Open Payment Initiative
- Wire transfer
- Electronic funds transfer
- ERIDANE

== Sources ==
- “Standardisierungsarbeiten im europäischen Zahlungsverkehr - Chancen für SEPA” SRC - Security Research & Consulting GmbH, Bonn - Wiesbaden, Germany, 2006, p. 5, 11 (PDF-transparencies)
- William Vanobberghen, „Le Projet EPAS - Sécurité, protection des personnes et des donnée: de nouvelles technologies et des standards pour fiabiliser le contrôle et l’identification“, Groupement des Cartes Bancaires, 27. June 2006 (PPT-transparencies)
- Hans-Rainer Frank, „SEPA aus Sicht eines europäischen Tankstellenbetreibers“, Arbeitskreis ePayment, Brussels, 11.May 2006, p. 11 (PDF-transparencies)
- GROUPEMENT DES CARTES BANCAIRES, „EUROPEAN STANDARDISATION FOR ELECTRONIC PAYMENTS“,
  Used to be at: https://web.archive.org/web/20070927174537/http://www.cartes-bancaires.com/en/dossiers/standard.html (dead link as of Okt 2011)
- "EPC Card Fraud Prevention & Security Activities", Cédric Sarazin – Chairman Card Fraud Prevention TF 19. December 2007, FPEG Meeting - Brussels, https://web.archive.org/web/20121024081807/http://ec.europa.eu/internal_market/fpeg/docs/sarazin_en.ppt
- "EPAS Members", https://web.archive.org/web/20161220082713/http://nexo-standards.org/members
