= Mike Ejeagha =

Nigerian folklorist and musician

- Also known as: Gentleman Mike Ejeagha
- Born: 4 April 1930; Imezi Owa, Ezeagu, Colonial Nigeria
- Died: 6 June 2025 (aged 95) Enugu, Nigeria
- Genre: Igbo music
- Occupation: Musician
- Instrument: Guitar
- Label: Premier Records

Mike Ejeagha (4 April 1930 – 6 June 2025) was a Nigerian folklorist, songwriter and musician. Also known as "Gentleman Mike Ejeagha", Ejeagha started his music career in the mid-20th century. He was an influential figure in the evolution of Igbo music genre.

== Early life and career ==
Ejeagha was born on 4 April 1930 in Imezi Owa, Ezeagu, Enugu State. His father was a civil servant who worked with the Ministry of Health in Enugu. Ejeagha attended St. Patrick's Primary School, Ogbete, Enugu. At a young age, he played ogene with his friends. In 1945, he joined Coal Camp Boys, a local music group in Enugu. After completing his primary education in 1948, he continued to pursue his passion for music. In 1949 at the age of 20, he became an apprentice, learning hairdressing with his friend Cyprain Ozochiawa, who was a barber and musician. He also learnt how to play guitar. Ejeagha was invited by Joseph Ogbu to join his band as a guitarist in 1950. Following his performance, he was called for an audition by Atu Ona who was the controller of the Nigerian Broadcasting Service, and was later offered a radio program Guitar Playtime, where he performed on radio and produced musical programs. During this time, he formed Premier Dance Band.

During the Biafran War, Ejeagha disbanded his music group but continued to perform a radio program Igbo paly on Radio Nigeria. Because of the war, he left Enugu for Umuahia, where he stayed until the war ended. Prior to the war, Ejeagha had released several singles in collaboration with CT Onyekwelu, including: "The unfortunate lady" (1957), "colliery massacre" (1959), and "Ofu nwanne" (1959). After the war, he was invited by the Nigerian Television Authority as a guest presenter for an Igbo program akuko N egwu in 1972; the program featured folksong lyrically composed by Ejeagha and his group. The program was a success and gave rise to the Igbo expression "Akuko Mike Ejeagha".

Ejeagha plays his music with guitar and his lyrics were written in Igbo language. He has contributed over three hundred recordings to the National Archives of Nigeria.

In 2018, Nigerian singer Kcee visited him in order to be permitted to use some of his songs, including: "Ome ka agu" and "Ka Esi Le Onye Isi Oche". On 12 September 2022, Pulse NG reported that a documentary film about Ejeagha titled Gentleman was under production. In July 2024, his 1983 song, "Ka Esi Le Onye Isi Oche", gained widespread recognition due to a viral dance challenge inspired by comedian Brain Jotter. On 2 September 2024, Peter Mbah renamed the Abakpa Road after Ejeagha.

== Controversies ==
Ejeagha had a court case which was finalised in 2013 with his record label Premier Records, as a result of producing a music video without the label's approval. The case was withdrawn when Enugu State Government intervened in the matter.

== Personal life and death ==
Ejeagha married his first wife in 1959, having three children before her death in 1963. He remarried in 1965 and had seven more children.

Ejeagha died after a long illness in Enugu, Nigeria, on 6 June 2025, at the age of 95.

== Discography ==
- Akanchawa
- Uwa Ngbede Ka Mma
- Elulube Lube
- Ezi Nwa Mgbeke.
- Enyi Ga Achi.
- Onye Uri Utaba.
- Ife Nji M’Ogo
- Atualu Omalu
- Ebini New Ude
- Mgba Enwude
- Udeze nwa nnem
- O di ka adi eme,
- Udo ka nma
- Ome ka agu
- Elulubelube
- Makojo
- Anene otulukpa
- Onye nwee o na-ebe onye enwero o na- ebe
