= Batile Alake =

Yoruba waka singer

Background information
- Also known as: Batili Alake
- Born: Ijebu Igbo, Ogun State, Nigeria
- Died: 2013
- Genres: Waka
- Occupation: Musician
- Instrument: Singing
- Years active: 1950s–1980s

Batile or Batili Alake (died 2013) was a prominent Yoruba waka singer.

== Personal life ==
Batile Alake was born in Ijebu Igbo, Ogun State. Alhaja Batile Alake died in 2013, aged about 78 years. Her precise age was not known.

== Career ==
Alake popularized the Islamic-inspired, Yoruba genre by playing at concerts and parties throughout Yorubaland, and was the first professional waka singer to record an album. She was most active during the 1950s and 1960s. She was among the overlapping crop of female musicians in the waka genre who came into prominence between the 1960s and 1980s. These include Olawunmi Adetoun, Decency Oladunni, Adebukola Ajao Oru, Foyeke 'Ajangila' Ayoka, Ayinke Elebolo, Aduke Ehinfunjowo, Hairat Isawu, Salawa Abeni, and Adijat Alaraagbo.

She sang in a chanting mode that originated from rara, a genre usually reserved for women in Yoruba tradition. With the percussive ensemble of drumming and back-up vocals, she and other practitioners of waka succeeded in transforming the chanting mode into commercial music, taking advantage of the opportunities that the recording industry provided. While younger musicians like Salawa Abeni are credited for waka innovations in terms of fast-tempo percussion and social commentary, Alake remained unsurpassed in the consistency of her style.

Being closer to the rara tradition than her younger contemporaries also gave her music an authentic feel, in the sense that it displayed a broad vocabulary. She was able more readily to substitute a word or phrase that fitted the moment. At the same time, she did not hesitate to abridge an authentic or archaic word if doing so would enhance the sonic outcome of the movement in which the word occurred.

Achieving prominence in the context of commercial music recording of the 1970s, Alake also released songs that pass as "praise-singing", dedicated to patrons or matrons who performed one favor or another for her. However, this is not a defining feature of her work. Later in the 1980s she also modified aspects of her style by deploying the three-tone percussion preferred by youthful listeners who looked to the music for songs suited to dance.
