= Owerri Bongo =

Igbo highlife Sub-Genre

- Stylistic origins: Tradional Igbo (Owerri) Drumming; Traditional Igbo Rhythms; Igbo highlife
- Cultural origins: 1960-1980s, Eastern Nigeria, Owerri

Regional scenes
- Nigeria

Other topics
- Ikwokirikwo; Ikorodo; Odumodu music; Ekpili

Owerri Bongo // (Bongo/Igbo Bongo) is a style of Igbo highlife music that has its origins in the Igbo people of Owerri and spread around all Imo State, which is in eastern Nigeria. The musical style is a sub-genre of Igbo highlife music. Unlike Igbo highlife, which is known for its brass horns and often somber feel. Owerri Bongo is typified by its heavy use of drums (Igba) and the Owerri dialect in which the genre is usually sung.

== History ==
The origins of Bongo music are not clear but it is believed that the sub-genre emerged during the 1980s and 1970s.

In 1972, Nze Dan Orji, and Raphael Amarabem formed the Peacocks International Band. The band’s first single, “Sambola Mama,” was the first truly popular Bongo music. It would go on to sell 150,000 copies in Ghana, and more than double that amount in Nigeria. The 1970s and ‘80s marked the strongest periods in the trajectory of Bongo music.

Even though bongo's origins are not clear it's reputed that the sub-genre remained popular within the city of Owerri but lost its relevance because of the Biafran war but re-emerged sometime during the 1970s The subgenre was popularised in the late 1970s by the Oriental Brothers International Band. Following the proliferation of pedal guitars in Nigerian music in the late 1970s the Oriental Brothers international band broadened the sub-genre by adding more complex guitar riffs with more emphasis on vocals.

=== Etymology ===
Because of the heavy usage of drums in the sub-genre, it is believed that the term "Bongo" in Owerri Bongo got its name from the Bongo drum. In the Owerri dialect, bongos are known as "ogwe" (drum) which when hit makes a high-pitched sound.
