= Bala Miller =

Nigerian musician

Bala Miller (1928–2003) was a Nigerian musician who was influential in the development of the highlife music scene in Nigeria.

== Life ==
The son of Rev Miller of Zaria, a missionary who was an early Christian convert from Hausaland. Miller was born in 1928 in Pankshin, Plateau State. He was the last son in a family of five girls and three boys. Miller's upbringing exposed him to music at an early age. He developed interest in music when his father was posted to the Holy Trinity Church in Lokoja, for the first time in his life, he saw various musical instruments within the church and its adjoining school, instruments that were purchased or handed down by the colonial militia. Miller took interest in playing the church's musical instruments, at age nine, he was in the school's band and also sang during church services.

=== Career ===
He attended CMS Grammar School, Lagos where he was active in the school's band. While in school, he joined a Calabar Brass Band that played at street corners and in weddings. After graduation, he studied marketing and also played as a part-time member of Samuel Akpabot's band. He worked for Lever Brothers in Lagos and in the evenings played the trumpet or the cornet with Akpabots' band. When Akpabot traveled abroad, Miller formed a band with an hotelier, Laremi Cole called the West End Club after Cole's West End Hotel. However, working for Lever Brothers entailed that Miller traveled a lot, so when he was posted outside of Lagos, Miller introduced Victor Olaiya, a trumpeter and band leader in one of Bobby Benson's bands to join West End Club as band leader. They had a hit with the highlife song, Oni dodo, oni moi moi. Chris Ajilo, a band leader in England and his friend Sammy Lartey also joined the team. They played regularly at the hotel mostly for kicks, however the band was struggling financially. But when Benson later approached Ajilo and another bandmate, Samuel Lartey to form a new band, their exit caused disruption in the band and Miller had to regroup. Luckily, Miller wrote his first major hit Kusimilaya, the song's popularity coincided with the visit of Queen Elizabeth to Nigeria and Miller's song was performed during the queen's visit. He later composed Kusimilaya 2, teaming with Fela Sowande and Steve Rhodes for the arrangement.

In 1956, he joined Nigerian Breweries and was posted to Kaduna, with Victor Olaiya, the leading band member, the band later became known as Victor Olaiya and the Cool Cats.

While in Northern Nigeria, Miller visited a hotel that had three bands playing, one of the bands was called Universal Band, he became a mentor to the band's members. The band later changed their name to Sahara All-Stars, after a visit to the Lagos music scene. Miller worked for different corporations, in 1966, he worked for the Nigeria Port Authority in Lagos, there he formed the company's band, Harbours Dance Band. The new band regularly played at Island Club.

In 1973, he organized the establishment of a music school in Kano. The governor of Kano, Audu Bako was a friend of Miller and had asked Miller for input in solving juvenile delinquency within the state, Miller suggested a musical school to train young adults how to play instruments. When the school opened in 1973, Miller was appointed its first director. In 1977, Miller was involved in the development of the music programme at FESTAC 77, during the festival's preparations, he was inspired to form a new band. In March 1977, after placing ads for players, he formed Bala Miller and the Music Pyrameeds of Africa. Originally a twelve-piece band that later grew to become a 28-piece big band. The band was innovative for his use of hausa lyrics in highlife composition.

In 1985, Miller had a variety show on NTA Network.
