= Open Payment Initiative =

Payment application interface

The Open Payment Initiative, or O.P.I. for short, was launched by Wincor Nixdorf in 2003 to standardize the application interface between the electronic point of sale (EPOS) application and any cashless payments solution installed on the electronic funds transfer at point of sale (EFTPOS) payment terminal. The specification for this interface focused mainly on international and cross-industry aspects. The interface made it possible to integrate varying EFT/PoS solutions in European POS projects for the first time.

During the development of the first release, and to promote the adoption of the standard, Diebold donated the specification and associated intellectual property to the International Forecourt Standards Forum (IFSF) and worked together with IFSF members to launch the specification as the IFSF POS-EPS Standard in 2002. The O.P.I specification, launched in 2003, was based on the IFSF POS-EPS standard and subject to IFSF intellectual property rules. This transfer of IP to IFSF accelerated the adoption of the specification and it soon became a de facto standard, spreading from Germany to retailing projects throughout Europe.

The IFSF specification was developed primarily for the service station industry and to which retail features have been added. Wincor Nixdorf included several extensions in their OPI version of the POS-EPS standard, including, for example, a specification for telecoms and TCP/IP messaging to deliver the messages.

In 2016, IFSF launched version 3 of the IFSF POS-EPS standard. This was a significantly updated version designed, in part, to de-couple Loyalty and Payment and which is not backwards compatible with V1 (there was no version 2).

In 2023, IFSF and Conexxus jointly launched an API based version of the POS-EPS standard to support the industry as technology evolves.

== Versions ==
Version	Description	Published
1.0	IFSF POS-EPS V1 Interface Specification v1.00	Aug 2002
1.2	EFT-Standard Interface for POS Applications	Feb 2003
1.2.1	EFT-Standard Interface for POS Applications	Sep 2002
1.3	EFT-Standard Interface for POS Applications	Feb 2005
3.0	IFSF POS-EPS V3 Interface Specification v3.00	Feb 2016
1.00	Part 4-30 POS-EPS API	Mar 2023

== Technical solution ==
The interface standard does not depend on a specific operating system. It is an XML-based interface. Communication takes place via TCP/IP. The XML messages are exchanged over two sockets that are referred to as channels (channel 0 and channel 1). The original OPI/IFSF specification defines three message pairs:

- Card Request/Response (channel 0)
- Service Request/Response (channel 0)
- Device Request/Response (channel 1)

Using the interface gives a payment solution access to the PoS peripherals, e.g. to a PoS printer to print out receipts, a display to output messages to the cashier or cardholder, or a magnetic card reader. Decoupling the interface in this way increases its flexibility for integration in international, solution and industry-specific scenarios for users as well as for PoS and payment solution providers, and therefore also protects their investments.

== International installations ==
Since 2003, the IFSF/O.P.I. interface has been deployed by various software and EFT/PoS solution providers in numerous projects in the Netherlands, Germany, France, Ireland, Austria, Portugal, Switzerland, UK and Denmark.

== See also ==
- EPAS
