= Oyo =

Oyo may refer to:

== Places ==
=== Nigeria ===
- Oyo Empire, a former Yoruba state that covered parts of Nigeria and Benin, or the capital city
- Oyo State, a present-day state of Nigeria named after the Oyo Empire
- Oyo, Oyo State, a city founded in the 1830s as an alternative capital of the remnants of the old Oyo empire

=== Republic of the Congo ===
- Oyo, Congo, a city in the Cuvette Region

=== Indonesia ===
- Oyo River, in southern Java

== Other uses ==
- Oyo Boy Sotto (born 1984), Filipino actor
- Oyo (e-reader), e-book reader
- Oyo Hotel & Casino, a casino resort in Las Vegas
- Oyo Rooms, a chain of hotels that also offers rentals
- Õÿö, album by Angélique Kidjo
