= Brian Lisus =

Violin maker born in South Africa

Brian Lisus (born 1956 or 1957) is a violin maker born in South Africa, who started the first violin making School in South Africa. He is currently teaching in Ojai, California, US, and owns a violin making shop there.

== Early life ==
Lisus was raised in a South African suburb of Cape Town in a musical family. His godfather was a cellist and Lisus grew up listening to the music of family and of visiting musicians. In the 1970s, Lisus took a three-year violin-making course at the Newark School of Violin Making, in England.

== Violin-making ==
Lisus founded a violin-making school, Piccolo Cremona, in a large house in Plumstead, a southern suburb of Cape Town.

Lisus uses mainly 16th-century instrument-making methods and materials. He makes his own varnish from walnut oil, Strasbourg turpentine mixed with plant resins such as mastic, and sandarac.

He is known as the Maker of "The Quartet of Peace", which honors the 4 Nobel Peace Prize Laureates from South Africa: Nelson Mandela, F.W. de Klerk, Albert Luthuli and Archbishop Desmond Tutu. The instruments have been played at charity events that support music education for children in South Africa. He named the two violins, viola, and cello Freedom, Peace, Reconciliation and Hope.
