= Dr Sir Warrior =

Nigerian musician and guitarist (1947–1999)

- Born: Christogonus Ezebuiro Obinna; 1947; Imo State, Colonial Nigeria
- Died: 6 February 1999 (aged 51–52)
- Other name: Ultimate Dr. Sir Warrior
- Occupations: Guitarist, musician, band leader
- Years active: 1960s-1999
- Musical career
- Genre: Igbo highlife
- Instruments: Guitar; vocals

Christogonus Ezebuiro Obinna (1947 – 2 June 1999), alias Dr. Sir Warrior, also known as Ultimate Dr. Sir Warrior was a Nigerian Igbo highlife musician, guitarist and bandleader. He was the leader of the Oriental Brothers International Band which was popular in the Nigerian Igbo highlife music scene for several decades. He performed primarily in Nigeria, as well as performing internationally in places such as London and the United States of America with his crew.

He recorded 12 platinum and 10 gold hits. His 1978 studio album, Nwanne Awu Enyi went gold, and sold more than 7.8 million copies.

== Musical career ==
Dr. Sir Warrior started playing the guitar in the 1960s at aged 11, and he joined the Oriental Brothers International Band in the 1970s. The band later split into Prince Ichita & the Great Oriental Brothers International Band, Oriental Brothers International, and then the original Dr. Sir Warrior & His Oriental Brothers International, simply called The Oriental Original. He had about 12 platinum and 10 gold hits in his career.

== Family ==
Dr Sir Warrior was married and had five children (three boys & two girls). His first son had said of him "He did not allow us to get interested in music. He wanted us to finish our education first. He would always emphasize that education was the best legacy, other things could follow later". The younger Ajuzieogu knew that he would one day be a highlife musician like his dad. They both said, "As long as we intend to pursue music as career we will still abide with our father's wish". His legacy was summarised by Oliver De Coque, who in paying tribute to Dr. Sir Warrior, said, "He was a very good and amiable person. We have lost such a genius in highlife." Sir Warrior died on June 2, 1999, because of a brief illness after his last 2 performances.

== Discography ==
- Nwanne Abu Enyi (1978)
- Jide Nkegi (1981)
- Ndi Adudu (1986)
- Chi Abu Otu (1982)
- Ndi Ji Ego (2011)
- My Success( 2014)
- Hapum Mebiri (2014)
- Ugo Chinyere
- Anri Aku
- Nakwa Echeki
- Agwo Loro Ibe Ya
- Oko Nke Gi
- Onye Obula Zoba isi Onwe
