= European Parliament Ambassador School programme =

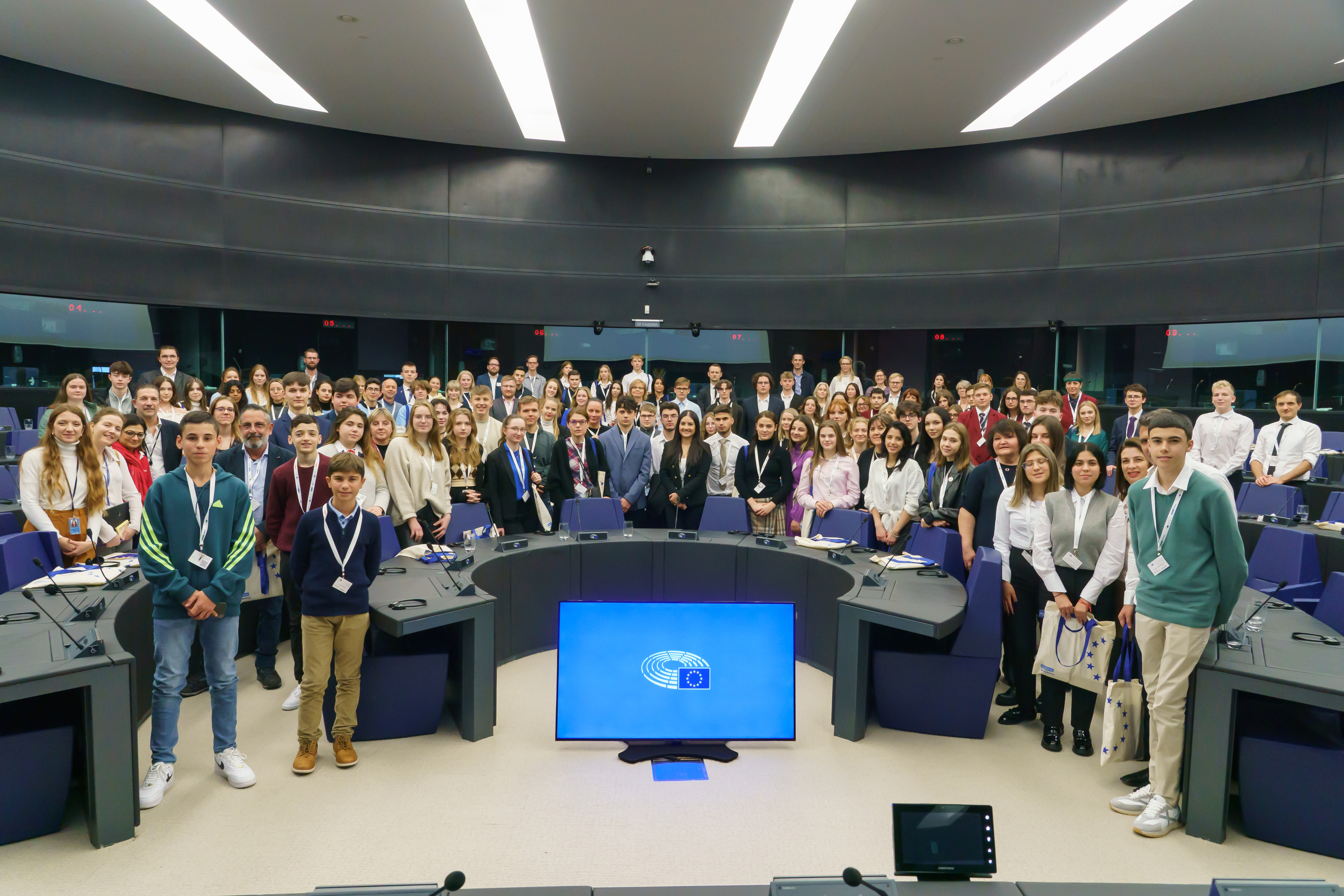
Students and teachers attend an EPAS seminar at the European Parliament in 2023

The European Parliament Ambassador School programme (EPAS) is an educational programme for secondary schools and colleges in the European Union and the United Kingdom run by the European Parliament. The programme aims to improve students' political knowledge and participation by educating them about the system of parliamentary democracy across Europe, as well as what the European Parliament views as the values of European citizenship.

EPAS was launched in the Netherlands in 2010 as the Een 10 voor Europa programme, which aimed to educate Dutch secondary school students about Europe and European cooperation, as well as how the EU influences their everyday lives. From 2015, the programme was expanded to other member states of the EU and given its current name and aims, before also being opened up to the UK after Brexit in 2021.

In the programme, the European Parliament designates participating schools and colleges as European Parliament Ambassador Schools, with students and teachers at these schools then designated as European Parliament Junior Ambassadors and European Parliament Senior Ambassadors respectively to organise activities and events which promote Europe and the programme's aims. As of 2025, there are around 2,000 schools across the EU and the UK which have been designated as Ambassador Schools, with around 5,000 teachers and almost 35,000 students serving as senior and junior ambassadors of the European Parliament.

== History ==
The European Parliament Ambassador School programme (EPAS) was launched by the European Parliament in the Netherlands in 2010 as the Een 10 voor Europa (A 10 for Europe) programme. The programme aimed to educate secondary school students in the Netherlands about Europe and European cooperation, as well as how the European Union (EU) influences their everyday lives. Participating schools in the programme were designated by the European Parliament as European Parliament Ambassador Schools and tasked with delivering a modified curriculum which taught students about the history of Europe and the EU, as well as what the European Parliament identified as European values. At each school, a teacher would become a European Parliament Senior Ambassador and oversee a group of students known as European Parliament Junior Ambassadors. These ambassadors would then deliver and organise projects and events at their schools which promoted the programme and its aims.

From 2015, the European Parliament started expanding the programme to other countries in the EU. The programme was renamed the European Parliament Ambassador School programme, with the new objective of creating an EU-wide network of ambassador schools to improve students' political knowledge and participation and educate them about the system of parliamentary democracy across Europe, as well as what the European Parliament identifies as the values of European citizenship.

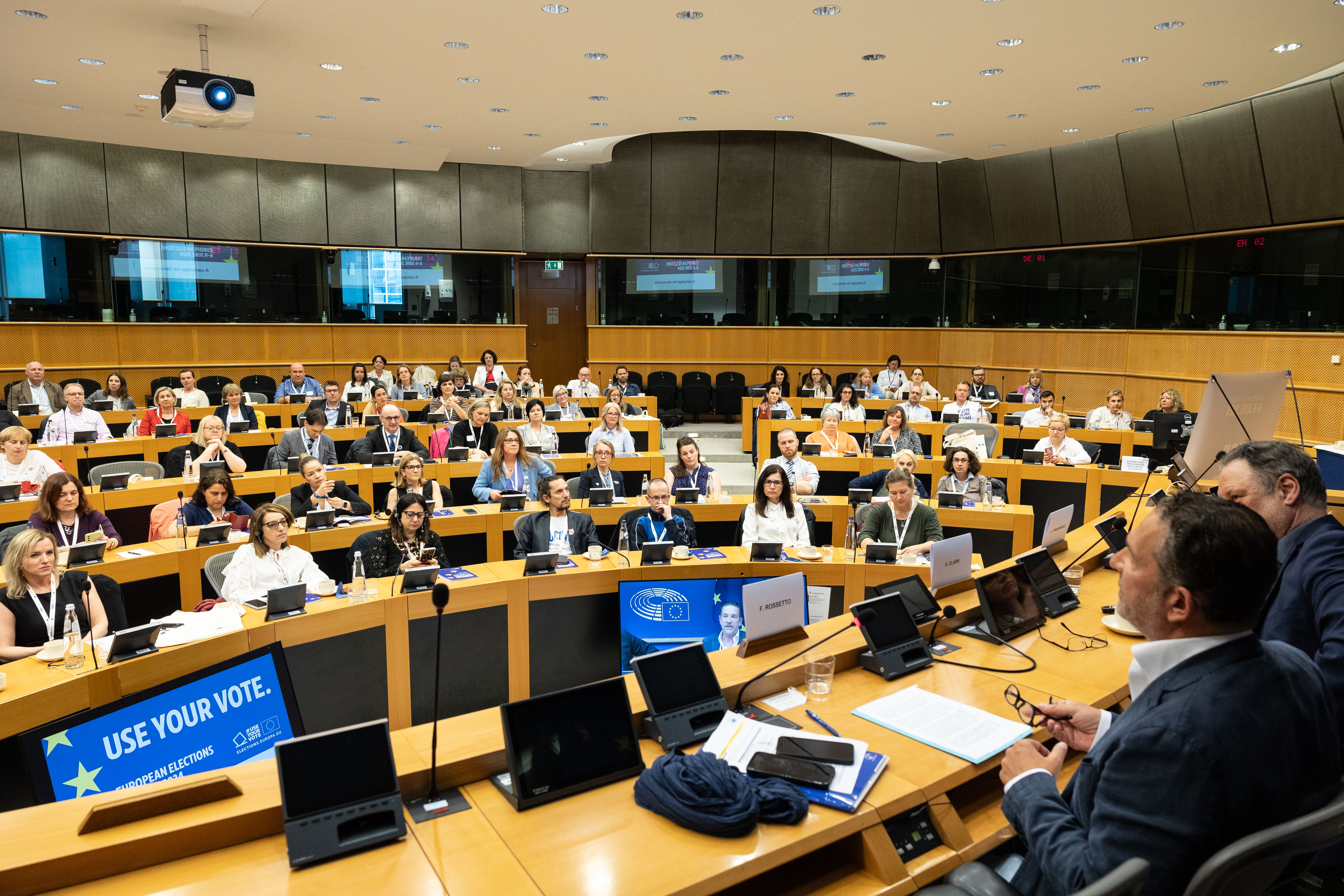
Teachers attend an EPAS seminar for the 2024 European Parliament election

In the 2015–2016 academic year, the programme was piloted in six other EU member states, Italy, Germany, France, Spain, Ireland and Poland. In France, the programme was also opened up to schools in the overseas territories in the overseas territories. In the 2016–2017 academic year, the European Parliament voted to expand the programme to all 28 member states of the EU in an attempt to encourage increased youth voter turnout in the 2019 European Parliament election.

In 2021, the European Parliament opened the programme to schools in the United Kingdom after it left the EU a year earlier, as part of its campaign to maintain ties with pro-EU youth in the country and tackle disinformation in the UK about the EU following the 2016 United Kingdom European Union membership referendum.

== Implementation ==
EPAS is a free and voluntary programme open to schools in the UK and all EU member states. Participating schools volunteer to join the programme and are then designated by the European Parliament as European Parliament Ambassador Schools. Students and teachers chosen by these schools are then designated by the European Parliament as European Parliament Junior Ambassadors and European Parliament Senior Ambassadors respectively, in order to organise activities and events which promote Europe and the aims of the programme. Junior ambassadors then represent the European Parliament in their schools and local communities with the support of their senior ambassadors, who teach them about the programme and European parliamentary democracy and also mentor them to help them organise these activities and events. Senior ambassadors are offered training on European politics to help them deliver the programme at their schools.

Activities and events are organised through the academic year. Junior ambassadors organise several activities, including debates, workshops and events with members of the European Parliament. These focus on several themes which relate to Europe, such as international and European democracy, European values, multilingualism and European integration. International student exchange programmes are also organised between different ambassador schools across Europe, including between schools in the UK and member states of the EU. Different ambassador schools can also co-operate as they implement of the programme.

At the end of each academic year, the European Parliament reviews the work of the schools and their ambassadors, with schools judged as successfully implementing the programme retaining their designation as ambassador schools with their senior and junior ambassadors awarded official accreditation for their ambassadorial work.

Every year, the European Parliament organises an international two-day event, #EPAStogether, which brings together junior and senior ambassadors from different countries across Europe. The purpose of the event is to enable networking between participants of the programme across different countries.

== Membership ==
As of 2025, there are around 2,000 schools across the EU and the UK which have been designated as ambassador schools, with around 5,000 teachers and almost 35,000 students serving as senior and junior ambassadors of the European Parliament. In 2023, there were 1,500 schools and 23,000 students in the network.

In Luxembourg, half of all secondary schools have ambassador school status. In the UK, there are 13 ambassador schools. 59 schools in Croatia have the status, with most of these being grammar schools and mixed schools. In Austria, there are 86 schools with the status, across all nine of its federal states. More than 100 schools in Romania are part of the programme.

== Reception ==
In the UK, the EPAS programme has been positively received by Liberal Democrat and Labour MPs and former MEPs for helping to maintain ties between the UK and the EU after Brexit. However, the Eurosceptic organisation Get Britain Out has criticised EPAS as "nothing more than an attempt to push the ideology of federalism within the European Union into the minds of young people in the UK" with the "end goal of encouraging the UK to re-join the EU".
