= Igbo rap =

Nigerian music genre

- Stylistic origins: Hip hop, Igbo traditional music, African American music
- Cultural origins: Late 1990s Southeastern Nigeria (especially Enugu)
- Typical instruments: Rapping, vocals, keyboard, sampler, drums

Fusion genres
- Igbo highlife

Other topics
- Igbo rappers; Nigerian hip hop

Igbo rap is a Nigerian style of hip hop music that originated in the Igbo-dominated southeastern region of Nigeria and has become more popular since 2000. The style draws its main influences from Igbo traditional music and African American music. Aside other derived styles, it can be combined with highlife, R&B and afro-soul. Most artists and groups who perform Igbo rap usually deliver their lyrics in the Igbo language, although on some occasions, Igbo is blended with Pidgin English.

Early pioneers in the scene include Mr Raw, MC Loph, and 2Shotz. Today, many musical acts like Phyno, Ugoccie, Zoro, and Jeriq are considered Igbo rap artists.

== See also ==
- Igbo language
- Igbo culture
