= Igba =

African percussion instrument

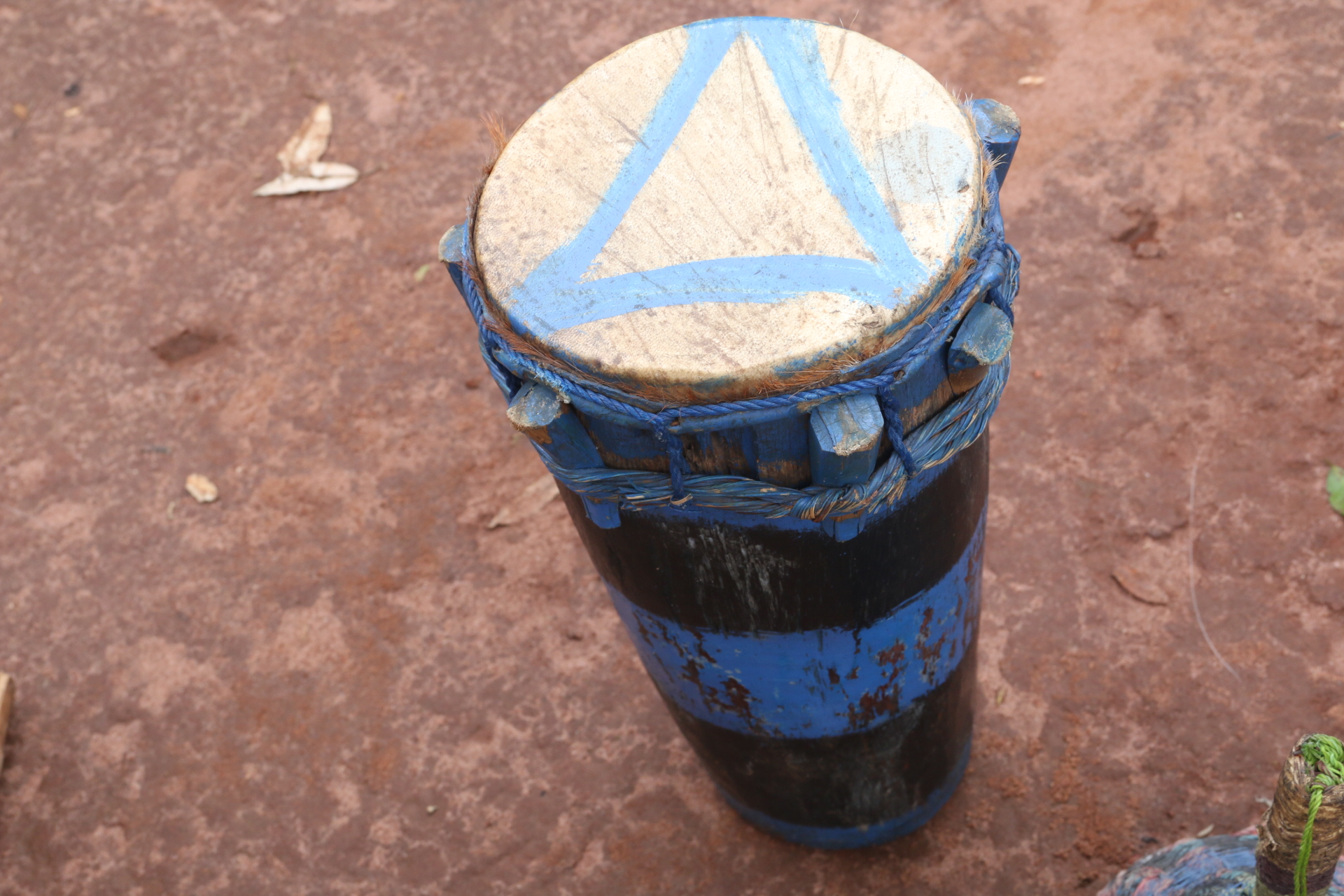
- Classification: African Percussion instrument, Heads are antelope skin.

The igba// is a tom-tom that has a beating surface of the same approximate diameter as a bongo. An igba may be as small as seven inches, or as tall as three feet. Traditionally, the deeper shelled igba are played with the hand, while the shorter drums are played with a curved stick. In an ensemble these drums often lead, and are used to "talk" by the talking drummers. By hammering on the tuning wedges which line the perimeter of the skin, the player tightens the drum's skin (usually made from antelope) to achieve the desired pitch and tone.

The igba (Cylinder-drum) is a piece of hollow wood covered at one end with animal hide held down tight with fasteners. The artist carries it over his shoulder with the help of a shoulder strap. The artist produces the sound by beating on the animal hide with his fingers or combination of one set of fingers and a special stick. The cylinder-drum accompanies dances, songs, religious and secular ceremonies, and its tunes have been known to give special signals for good news as well as bad news.

== See also ==
- Owerri Bongo
- Igbo music
- Ogene
