= Bright Chimezie =

Nigerian musician (born 1960)

- Also known as: Okoro Junior
- Born: Bright Chimezie Ironmuo; 1 October 1960 (age 66)
- Origin: Umuahia, Abia State, Nigeria
- Genres: Zigima,igbo highlife
- Occupation: Musician
- Spouse: Chinyere Chimezie

Bright Chimezie (born 1 October 1960) is a Nigerian musician known for his influential music style called Zigima Sound. Hailing from Abia State, Nigeria, Chimezie rose to fame in the early 1980s with his unique blend of traditional Nigerian music, Igbo highlife, and chanted vocals. His music also addresses societal issues such as colonialism, economic exploitation, and cultural identity with a touch of humor in his lyrics.

Bright Chimezie has released several notable songs, including "Ube Nwanne," "Because of English," "Respect Africa," and "African Style." His contribution to the promotion of African culture and values earned him the title "The Duke of African Music." He is also known for his dance steps.

== Early life ==
Bright Chimezie was born into the family of Reverend and Mrs. Ezekiel Iromuoh of Ekeoba village, Umuahia, the capital city of Abia State, southeastern Nigeria on October 1, 1960. Bright Chimezie's musical journey began at the age of 7, when he joined his clan's cultural group, later becoming its leader. As a youngster, Bright Chimezie was deeply involved in the Methodist Church Ekeoba Choir, where he sang the alto part and participated in several performances and recordings.

After completing his primary education at Umuhu Central School, Umuahia, despite the challenges posed by the Civil War, Bright Chimezie continued his education at Ohuhu Community Secondary School in Amaogwugwu, Umuahia. During his time there, he led the school band and collaborated with other popular Eastern groups between 1974 and 1979. He also made his first television appearance in 1976 on an NTA show.

After completing secondary school in 1976, Chimezie joined the Modernized Odumodu Cultural Dance Group, which specialized in storytelling through music. The group gained popularity across eastern Nigeria until its disbandment in 1979.

In Lagos State, Chimezie joined the Nigerian Customs and Excise Dance Band, touring the country. In 1984, he departed from the Nigerian Customs and Excise Band to form "Ziggima," a music group that blended traditionally rooted African music with Igbo traditional musical elements and captivating dance steps. The name Ziggima derives from the Igbo expression "ozi gi ma," meaning "the message that you already know."

== Career ==
In 1984, Bright Chimezie, also known as Okoro Junior, introduced his Zigima Movement to the music scene with his debut album, Respect Africa. The album featured songs such as the titular track Respect Africa, Lekwe Uwa M, Liza, and You Can Never Hurry The Sunrise. His next album, Life of Yesterday, was released early in 1987 and included songs like No True Love (alternatively titled Where Is Love?), Nne m Oma (a tribute to his mother), and Message Boy. In total, Chimezie has released eight studio albums in his musical career.

In June 2025, Bright Chimezie signed a landmark deal with Sony Music Publishing to expand the global reach of his music catalog, which blends traditional Igbo highlife with contemporary influences. The agreement aims to promote African musical heritage on an international scale.

Chimezie's 1984 song "Because of English", recounting and critiquing the punishments used by some schools in Nigeria for students using local languages instead of English, experienced a new wave of popularity in 2025 when it was sampled by Davido on the song With You, prompting him to release an acoustic version.

== Stage performances ==
He has performed in locations such as London, Austria, Brazil, and various other countries. Notably, Bright Chimezie represented Nigeria at the OPEC Cultural Festival held in Caracas, Venezuela, where he showcased the music and culture of his homeland. He performed for Nelson Mandela during the latter's visit to Nigeria upon his release from prison in 1990 and was warmly embraced by both Mandela and his wife Winnie Mandela.

== Awards and recognitions ==
He has picked up awards from institutions such as the University of Nigeria, Nsukka, and the Nigerian Union of Journalists, Tribune Chapter, in recognition of his musical achievements. Notably, he was bestowed with the title "Duke of African Music" by the royal father, Oba Omowonuola Oyeyede Oyeyonsin II, from Oyo State, southwestern Nigeria.

== Filmography ==
In addition to his musical endeavors, Bright Chimezie has made appearances in several Nigerian movies, including "Deadly Proposal," "Abuja Boys," and others.

== Family ==
Bright Chimezie is married to Chinyere Chimezie, and together they have five children, namely, Kelechi, Chukwuemeka, Chukwudi, Chinemeze (Micheal), and Chidinma.

== Discography ==
- You can't hurry the sunrise
- Ala Eze
- Liza
- Enwete lam Nwa Baby
- This Is Our Home
- Greetings in Africa
- Ube Nwanne
- Achorom Zigma Sound
- Do We Obi Gi Ocha
- Oyinbo Mentality
- Remember Your Roots
- Mama No Na Obim
- Nne Oma
- Oji Mu Eme Onu
- Respect Africa
- Because Of English
- I Have Got A Rhythm
- Life Na Teacher
- Iheoma Si Gi Na Obi
- Ifeoma-2021
- Message Boy
- Life Of Yesterday
- Where is Love
