= Ikorodo =

Traditional Igbo style of music

- Stylistic origins: Traditional Igbo folk music
- Cultural origins: Igbo Land

Other topics
- Odumodu music; Ekpili; Ikwokirikwo; Owerri Bongo

Ikorodo music is a traditional Igbo folk music. The genre is originated from culture of the Nsukka people in Enugu State, Nigeria. The traditional folk genre includes many arrays of performance practices as a result isn't solely aural as it intertwines with visual expressions. Th genre features a set of horns known as opi, revered for its melodic resonance and plays pivotal role in orchestrating complex rhythmic patterns through the application of hocket technique.
