= Ogene =

Igbo music style

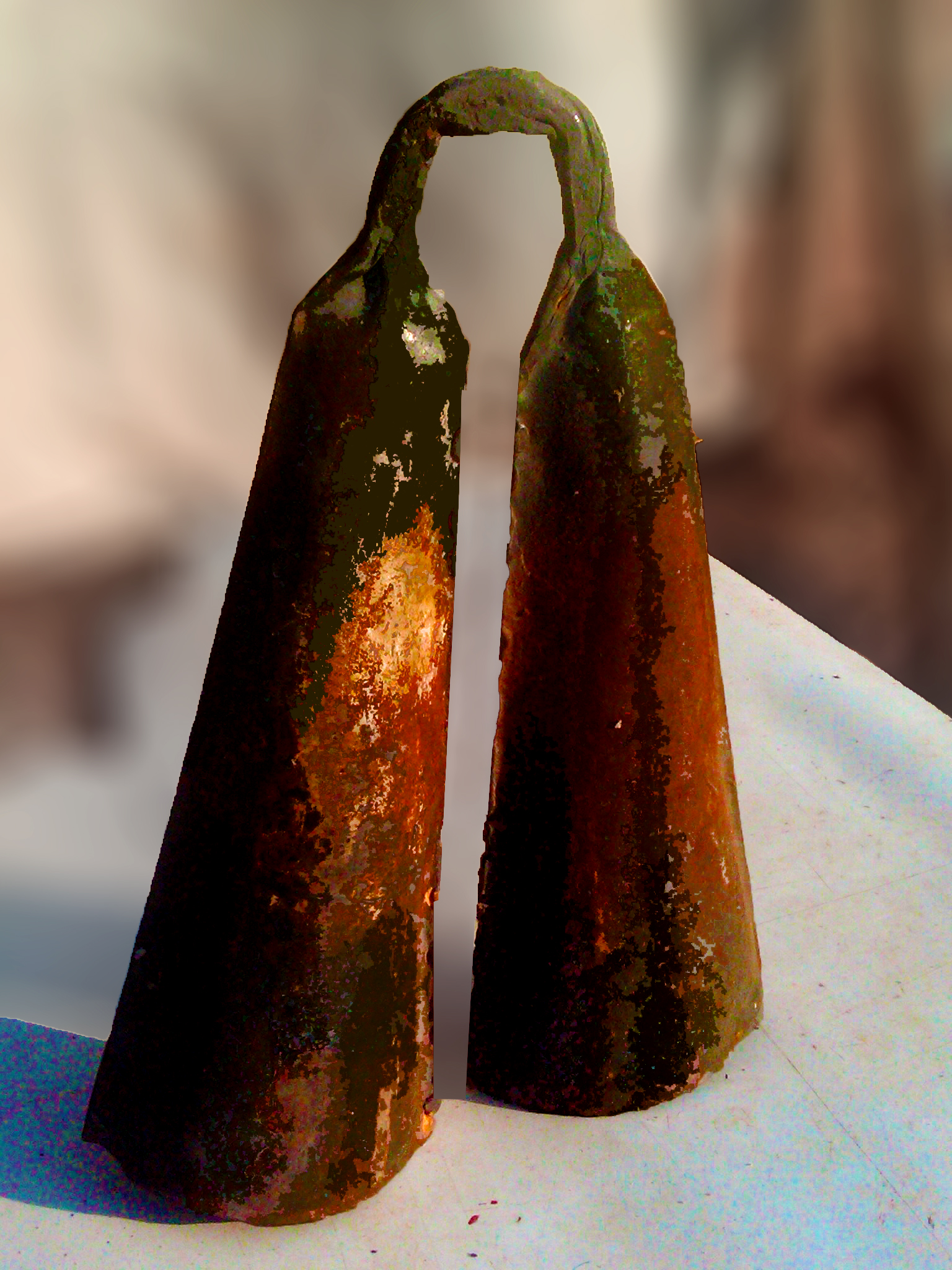
Ogene ndi Igbo

Ogene (Igbo pronunciation) is a style of Igbo music consisting of, and taking its name from, the ogene instrument, which is a large metal bell. The ogene instrument has historically been made by the Igbo people of Nigeria. It is one of the most important metal instruments of the people.

== Ogene as a musical instrument ==
The Ogene type of bell is commonly used as a "master instrument" in a bell orchestra in Igboland. It is an instrument of the struck idiophone class and is made of iron by specialist blacksmiths. The bell has a flattish, conical shape and is hollow inside. The sound comes from the vibration of the iron body when struck, which is made to resound by the hollow inside the bell. The iron body is usually struck with a soft wooden stick. The different parts of the Ogene, like the larger double bell and breast pair, produce musical intervals of a major third and a major second. A technique known as strike-muting is commonly used. In Ogene Anuka for example, tuning comes from open-stroke methods, forming a relative structure seen as C, E, F, A, F, G. These notes create pitch-tones because of inharmonic partials. Although the relative tuning stays mostly steady, there might be minor differences based on the builder or player. Ogene comes in different shapes and sizes but generally there are about 6 to 7 different main types of the Ogene instrument, which include:

Ogene (Metal gong) This type of ogene instrument is made into a single bell. They come in various shapes and sizes and are sometimes arranged in a chimes-like rack which is referred to as Ogene-phone.

Ogene N kpim bo (Double metal gong) This type of ogene instrument is double-belled and can also come in different shapes and sizes.

Ogene Nne Na Nwa (Mother and child gong) This variation of the ogene instrument features a double bell accompanied by an additional set of small bells attached to the curved handle. This secondary set is referred to as the ala (breasts) or nwa akwo n’azu (a child carried on the back), the latter term evoking the imagery of a nursing mother.

Ogene Nkpi-ito (Triple gong) This ogene instrument is simply a triple-shaped gong.

Ogene Nkpi-ino (Quadruple gong)

Alo (largest of the metal gongs) Alo is the largest of the ogene gongs. The shapes of alo vary but can reach up to 6 ft. The Alo instruments are typically single, though in exceedingly rare instances a double alo might be encountered.

== Ogene as a musical genre ==
Ogene as a musical style can be described or characterized by its unique rhythm, created using a set of metal gongs. Ogene music is often accompanied by other traditional instruments such as flutes, drums, and rattles. The rhythmic patterns and beats in Ogene music are vibrant and energetic. In a way when played the double ogene bells answer calls made on the master instrument which is played by the lead musician. The recognizable structure of the thematic expressions of ogene is the conversational components of the secondary themes where answers are given to these calls. This interaction between the ogene music resembles a call-and-response pattern. Ogene is improvisational as such the improvisational segments show the overall proper understanding of scale and proficiency skill needed in navigating tonal structures and acoustic potentialities which enables musicians to select what would best suit a spontaneous improvisational thematic segment in any performance. In the vocal parts of the music, the instrumentalists also sing as they play the instruments. The lyrics, most of the time, are of social interest and spans from folkloric to philosophical or political to gospel. Ogene music remains musically conceived and socially situated in Igbo culture as a piece of “absolute” music that is often incorporated into other Igbo genres of music. When the lyrics to the performance are rendered, the instrumentalists repeatedly use a consistent underlying theme while occasionally adding variations to the background of the Ogene. During breaks in the song improvisation occurs, lasting from one to four bars, followed by a return to the initial background to support the vocals. At times, these creative improvisations can extend for eight bars or even longer. The performers are guided by the audience's reactions. Ogene music holds significant cultural importance among the Igbo people, and its melodies and rhythms are integral to expressing the cultural identity and heritage of the region. As a result of the importance of ogene music to the Igbo identity, Ogene music has 3 distinctive styles that serve different cultural needs of the Igbo people. These styles are most often differentiated by the lyrical themes of the songs. These 3 main styles of ogene include

Tradional performance with Ogene instruments at Lagos Igbo Hangout 3.0 in Festac, Lagos, Nigeria, on 21 June 2026.

Tradional dancer dancing to the tune of Ogene instruments at Lagos Igbo Hangout 3.0 in Festac, Lagos, Nigeria, on 21 June 2026.

Ogene Anuka

Ogene Anuka is a complex form that uses different sets of four to eight iron bells of different sizes and pitches, each with a distinctive role. Ogene anuka is said to have originated from a now-extinct form of Igbo horn music duo of musicians playing two sets of water buffalo horns. The common lyrical theme of Ogene anuka is praise or recounts of accomplishments and exploits of the patrons who hire the musicians for social or private celebrations/events.

Ogene Ikpachi

Ogene Ikpachi is a type of Ogene music that originates from Agukwu Nri in Anambra State. Ogene ikpachi is often performed at cultural and religious events, such as the Igu Aro (New Year festival), the Ikeji (Yam festival), and the Ofala (Royal festival). The lyrical theme of Ogene ikpachi ranges from lyrics appealing to the strength of the community but most importantly the lyrical content of Ogene ikpachi delves more into the traditions of the Igbo people ie festivals, traditional weddings, etc.

Ogene Mkpakija

Ogene Mkpakija is a type of Ogene music that originates from Enugwu Ukwu in Anambra State. Ogene Mkpakija uses a set of three iron bells. In terms of origins although most sources point to the origin of Ogene music to be Anambra the origins of Ogene music are often disputed between the Anambra people and Enugu people as a result it isn't clear if the lyrically Ogene Mkpakija which comes from Enugwu Ukwu precedes its Enugu variant style known as Ogene Okponma. Regardless the common lyrical themes of Ogene mkpakija are often folkloric or proverbial. Another lyrical theme found in this style of ogene is the criticism of the Igbo society at large.

Other offshoots of Ogene music that are known but not properly studied include Ogene Okeokpa and Ogene Okponma. These musical styles of Ogene broaden the musical tapestry of the Igbo heritage and providing a rhythmic backdrop for various communal and traditional activities. The lively beats of Ogene have also been fused with contemporary styles, contributing to the diversity of Nigerian music.

== Other functions of the Ogene ==
The Ogene instrument has many other roles and purposes in the traditional Igbo society besides being used for musical expression. These other functions range from verbal and also include non-verbal use of the instrument. These other roles include:

Verbal and non-verbal Information broadcast use

In the traditional Igbo society, the town crier is often pictured with Ogene which was an essential tool for spreading news to the town/rural dwellers. Other instrument used for town announcements within Igbo society includes the Ekwe and the Ikoro. As the town crier travels through different towns, he uses the Ogene, hitting it at intervals to draw the people’s attention and deliver messages. Sometimes these messages are skillfully conveyed with only the unique sounds of the Ogene. The Ogene sounds and tones have a great meaning in the traditional Igbo culture in the past every adult could understand it and is often used to mimic human speech. The sound of the Ogene indicated something very important, and it made everyone pay attention whenever it rang through the town.

Security

In the cultural landscape of Igbo land, the Ogene instrument is sometimes used as part of a vital role in maintaining security. Its primary function mirrors that of the whistle or Security alarm acting as an alert mechanism to signal vigilance and caution among security personnel. For example during the pursuit of a perpetrator, the Ogene is struck and it resonates thereby communicating real-time updates and even situational reports to fellow stationed individuals, thus ensuring coordinated awareness and response among the security guards.

Religious use

In Igbo culture Ogene is used in religious settings such as shrines, temples or sacred groves. The Ogene stands as a pivotal implement present in numerous locations dedicated to divination practices. Throughout the divination ritual, the diviner employs the Ogene to pay homage to the gods and ancestors, invoking their presence and beseeching them to offer guidance or solutions.

War instrument

The ogene is used as a war instrument often being used in raising morale for warfare. Within the historical tapestry of Igbo culture, the Ogene holds a revered status as an instrument of war, revered for its role in igniting the fervor and readiness of warriors. Its significance lies in the ability to stir the warriors' adrenaline, infusing them with valor and determination. The resounding tones of the Ogene music resonate through the warriors, instilling a rhythmic pulse that fuels their resolve and courage as they march into battle, fortified and resolute in their pursuit.

== See also ==
- Ikwokirikwo
- Udu
- Ikoro
- Ọjà
