= Igbo Christian music =

Traditional Igbo Christian music genre

- Stylistic origins: Igbo Music; Igbo Highlife; Christian music; Church Music; Gospel Music; Jesus music
- Cultural origins: 19th century Igbo Land

Other topics
- Nigerian gospel

Igbo Christian Music (also referred to as Igbo gospel music) is an Igbo traditional musical genre written, performed, and sung to narrate or express Christian faith. The genre combines Christian religious themes such as praise, hymnals, worship, and other Christian themes with traditional Igbo musical/cultural versions or elements. It reflects the fusion of faith and culture within the Igbo Christian community.

== History ==
The History of Igbo Christian music can be traced to the 19th century when Christian missionaries would translate Christian hymnals into the Igbo language. Some Igbo converts also composed their hymns in Igbo, using local tunes and rhythms.
