= Ikoro =

Musical instrument used by the Igbo people

An Ikoro is a musical instrument created and used by the Igbo of Nigeria. It is a slit drum that is beaten with a stick or sticks and can be used in some parts of Igbo land for communicating, similar to a talking drum. Ikoro cannot be played by anyone. It is so special that any time its sound is heard people will gather at the village square. As soon as it sounds, people around assume that any of the following has happened: murder, land has been defiled, an outbreak of war, a calamity has befallen the community, etc. Any time the ikoro is heard, people gather at the village square to hear the latest developments. Ikoro also brings a sense of urgency.

The difference between the ikoro and the ekwe is the size. The ekwe is smaller in size and portable while the ikoro is enormous and often cut from the log of a tree. The ikoro cannot be carried by one person and is never carried from place to place. The ikoro is kept in a fixed place, usually at the village square. The ekwe is an ordinary musical instrument and is used to play many types of traditional music.
