= Oriental Brothers International =

Nigerian Igbo highlife group (1970s-2000s)

- Also known as: Oriental Brothers
- Origin: Eastern Region, Nigeria
- Genre: Igbo highlife
- Instruments: Guitar, Orchestra
- Years active: 1970s-2000s
- Label: Afrodisia
- Past members: Dr Sir Warrior†; Dan Satch Opara; Kabaka†; Nathaniel Ejiogu†; Prince Ichita†

The Oriental Brothers International, also known as The Oriental Brothers, was a Nigerian orchestra high life band from Eastern Nigeria, and was the country's first high life boy band formed shortly after the Nigerian-Biafran War in the 1970s. It was originally formed by Dr Sir Warrior, Dan Satch Opara, Nathaniel Ejiogu, Godwin Kabaka Opara and Prince Ichita.

The band released a total number of 39 studio albums, 7 compilations and 4 extended play.
