= Oliver De Coque =

Igbo highlife musician (1947–2008)

- Also known as: King of Highlife
- Born: Oliver Sunday Akanite; 14 April 1947; Ezinifite, Nnewi South, Anambra State, Nigeria
- Died: 20 June 2008 (aged 61)
- Genre: Igbo highlife
- Occupations: Singer, songwriter, record producer, composer, lead guitarist
- Years active: 1965–2008
- Labels: Olumo Records Nigeria Limited, Ogene Records

Oliver Sunday Akanite (14 April 1947 – 20 June 2008), better known as Oliver De Coque, was a Nigerian Igbo highlife musician, composer, and guitarist. One of Africa's most prolific recording artists, his career spanned over four decades. Oliver De Coque's extensive use of Igbo traditional rhythms and Congolese guitar melodies made him a leader in the Nigerian highlife music genre.

His stage name originated from his early days playing Ekpili music in 1976. The singer's band was initially called Oliver de coque and co-singers, and people affectionally referred to him as Oliver De Ka Okwe due to his love for playing okwe (draft). Over time, he adapted the nickname and created the stage name Oliver De Coque.

== Early life and career ==
De Coque was born in 1947, in Ezinifite, Anambra State, Nigeria, to an Igbo family. He started making Ekpili music when he was 17 years old, and was taught to play the guitar by a Congolese guitarist named Piccolo who was living in Nigeria. De Coque was an apprentice of juju musicians Sunny Agaga and Jacob Oluwale, and became locally well known by the time he was a teenager.

De Coque received international attention after performing in London in 1973, and his guitar work was featured in Prince Nico Mbarga's 1977 album Sweet Mother.

In a landmark ceremony, the then Alaafin of Oyo, Lamidi Adeyemi III, crowned him 'The King of Highlife' of Africa in 1994, for his consistency in his craft.

His debut album, Messiah Messiah, was released in 1977. In total, De Coque recorded 93 albums. Many of his songs were noted to be in the ogene genre, blending modern music with traditional Igbo harmonies. Singles included "People's Club of Nigeria", "Nempi Social Club", "Biri Ka Mbiri", "Ana Enwe Obodo enwe", "Nnukwu Mmanwu" and "Identity", the latter of which spent several weeks on Radio Nigeria 2's Top Ten in 1981.

In addition to his solo work, De Coque frequently played with the Igede International Band, led by his brother Eugene.

== Personal life and death ==
De Coque had 12 children and at least four sons, including Solar De Coque, Safin De Coque (Darlington Akanite), Edu De Coque (Chinedu Akanite), and Ikenna Akanite.

De Coque was awarded an honorary degree in music from the University of New Orleans.

De Coque died on 20 June 2008 following a sudden cardiac arrest. His son subsequently noted that De Coque had prioritised performing in 2008 but had planned to seek medical advice the month after his death.

== Legacy ==
On 14 April 2021, a Google Doodle showcased De Coque to mark what would have been his 74th birthday.

== Partial discography ==
- Messiah Messiah (1977)
- Odiri (2002)
- Biri ka m biri
- People's Club
- Chukwu Kelu Uwa Cho Ya Nma
- Father Father
- Opportunity (1982)
- Nwanne Di Na Mba
- All Fingers Are Not Equal
- Onye China Azo
- Ka Anyi Bilibe Ndu
- Messiah Messiah
- Uwa Cholu Obi Umeani
