= Ekpili =

Traditional Igbo folk music genre

- Stylistic origins: Traditional Igbo folk music
- Cultural origins: 19th century Igbo Land

Other topics
- Odumodu music; Ikorodo; Ikwokirikwo; Owerri Bongo

Ekpili// (also known as Ekpiri/ Egwu Ekpili or Akuko-na-egwu) is a style of folk genre of music which has its origins from the Igbo people in the Southeastern part of Nigeria. This style of Igbo folk music is characterized by the musical instrument known as "Ubo" a thumb piano which is also referred to as a thumb guitar in which the genre is most associated with. This style of music is also played with "Ichaka" (gourd rattle) and the clave. Ekpili music is also characterized by its lyrical content, which reflects the philosophical, social, and political views of the Igbo people.

== History/Etymology and Characteristics ==
The timeline for the origins of ekpili is uncertain but some researchers have traced this style of music to the 19th century. Though the origins are unclear it is unanimously believed that this style of folk music has its origins within the Anambra Basin. Although ekpili is most associated with "Ubo" (a thumb piano) the name of the folk genre is taken from an instrument called "ekpili". The instrument was introduced into the genre by the earlier musicians of the genre.

EgwuEkpili takes its name from ekpili, a rattle made of large pods of Uko tree, strung together on a rope about a foot long, which features as the main instrument in this kind of music common in Anambra divisions of Igboland, among the people of such towns as Achala, Aguleri, Awkuzu, Nando, Nteje, Oba, Ugbene, Ukwulu and Onitsha. According to legend, it is these people who received music from the song bird and took it to the rest of Igboland.

Further characteristics of ekpili include solo performance singing with a form of call and response chorus style which comes in at intervals. Ekpili is specific in the sense that the genre isn't crowded with so many instruments with the main focus being the vocals which narrates important messages for listeners. This style of Igbo folk genre is often described as "Akuko-na-egwu" (Story-in-music) in which the artist narrates a story in musical form with occasional instrumental interludes. Storytelling in the genre is often organized in a way in which an artist starts with the topic of the song and moves further into the story, goes back to the topic, and continues with the remainder of the story.
