= Udu =

Musical instrument of the Igbo of Nigeria

Udu Music

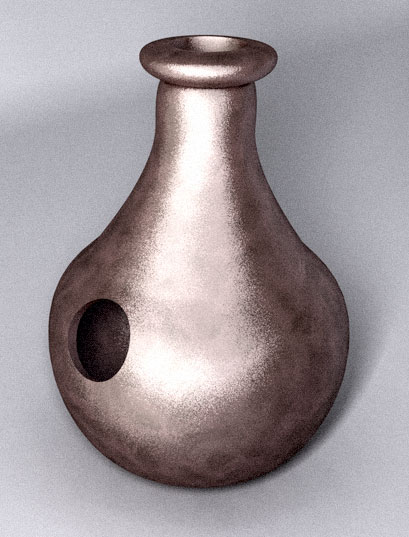
A band percussion pot

Sound of plastic, or fiberglass Udu

The kim-kim or Udu// is a plosive aerophone (in this case implosive) and an idiophone of the Igbo of Nigeria. In the Igbo language, ùdù means 'vessel' or 'pot'. This is a hand percussion instrument and it is one of the most important instruments in Igbo music.

== About ==
Early Udu drums were simply water jugs with an additional hole and were played by Igbo women for ceremonial purposes. Legend says that the Udu drum was made accidentally because a punched hole was on the side of the vessel, making it useless. Instead of throwing it away, the owner started to drum it.

== Construction ==
Usually, the Udu is made of clay. Sometimes, the ashes of relatives are used to make them too, but it also can be made out of plastic or glass. Today it is widely used by percussionists in many different music styles.

== Playing technique ==
The Udu is played in two primary ways: it is either placed on the lap or secured to a stand using duct tape. The player produces a bass sound by quickly striking the larger hole. Various pitches can be achieved by adjusting the hand position over the smaller upper hole. Additionally, the body of the instrument can be played using the fingers, creating a diverse range of sounds.

== Udu makers ==
- Clive Sithole
- Eugene Skeef
- kiki iizuka

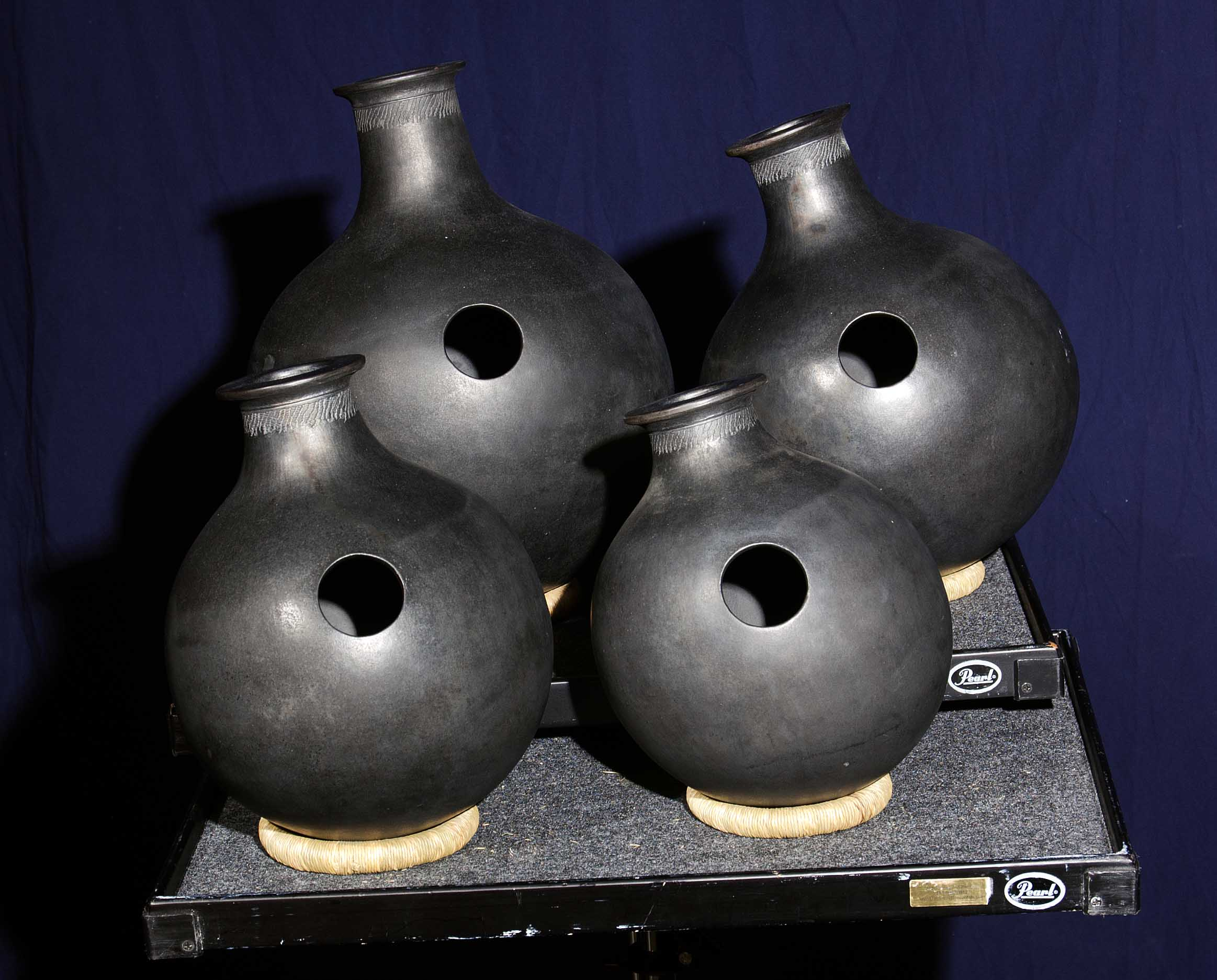
Udus

== See also ==
- Botija
- Ghatam
- Ipu
- Gagar
