= List of Nigerian musicians =

This is a list of Nigerian musicians.

Only notable individuals are included here; for groups, see List of Nigerian musical groups. Names are to be arranged by the first letter of Wikipedia reference.

== 0–9 ==
- 2Baba – hip-hop and R&B singer
- 9ice – hip-hop and Afropop singer

== A ==
- A-Q – hip-hop artist
- Abiodun Koya (born 1980) – gospel singer, opera singer
- Ada Ehi – Gospel Artiste and songwriter
- Adé Bantu – Nigerian-German musician, producer, front man of the 13-piece band BANTU
- Adekunle Gold – singer, songwriter
- Adesua Etomi-Wellington
- Adewale Ayuba – fuji music singer
- Ado Gwanja – hausa singer
- Afrikan Boy – rapper
- Afro Candy – pop singer
- Alamu Atatalo – sekere singer, a type of traditional Yoruba music
- Ali Nuhu – Hausa singer and songwriter, Kannywood
- Ali Jita – Hausa singer and songwriter
- Amarachi – singer, dancer, violinist
- Andre Blaze – rapper
- AQT (Singer)
- Aramide – Afro-Jazz singer
- Ara – singer and talking drummer
- Asake – Afrobeat, Afropop, amapiano
- Asuquomo – musician
- Aṣa – R&B, country and pop singer-songwriter
- Ayinde Bakare – Yoruba jùjú and highlife musician
- Ayinla Kollington – Fuji musician
- Ayinla Omowura – apala musician
- Ayola – Afropop singer
- Ayo Maff – singer
- Ayra Starr – Afropop & R&B singer

== B ==
- Babatunde Olatunji – drummer
- Babyboy AV – singer, songwriter
- Bella Shmurda – singer, songwriter
- Banky W – pop and R&B singer-songwriter
- Blackface Naija – reggae musician
- Blackmagic – rapper, singer, songwriter
- Blaqbonez – rapper
- Bnxn – Afrobeat
- Boy Spyce – singer and songwriter
- Brymo – singer
- Burna Boy – Afrobeats and reggae-dancehall musician
- Bongos Ikwue – singer

== C ==
- CDQ – rapper, songwriter
- Celestine Ukwu – highlife musician
- Chella – Afrobeats
- Chidinma – pop singer
- Chike – singer, songwriter and actor
- Christy Essien-Igbokwe – Singer, songwriter, actress and philanthropist
- Chinko Ekun – rapper, songwriter
- Chinyere Udoma – Gospel musician
- Charly Boy – singer and songwriter
- CKay – Afrobeats, R&B
- Cobhams Asuquo – soul singer
- Cynthia Morgan – pop, hip-hop and dancehall singer

== D ==
- D'banj – pop singer
- Daddy Showkey – Galala Singer
- Da Emperor – indigenous rapper
- Da Grin – rapper
- Dammy Krane – singer, songwriter
- Darey – R&B singer-songwriter
- Dauda Epo-Akara – Yoruba musician
- Davido – pop singer
- Dekumzy – R&B and highlife singer
- Dele Ojo – juju music singer and performer
- Dice Ailes – pop singer
- Di'Ja – singer
- Dizzee Rascal – rapper
- DJ AB – rapper, songwriter and record producer
- DJ Lambo – singer
- Don Jazzy – recording artist and record producer
- DOTTi The Deity – singer
- D'Prince – Afropop singer
- Dr Sir Warrior – Igbo highlife musician and performer
- Dr. Alban – Nigerian-Swedish recording artist and producer
- Dr SID – pop singer
- Duncan Mighty – reggae singer

== E ==
- Ebenezer Obey – jùjú musician
- Ebuka Songs – gospel singer
- Echezonachukwu Nduka – pianist and musicologist
- Eddy Wata – Eurodance singer
- Eedris Abdulkareem – singer and rapper
- Ego Ogbaro – singer and songwriter
- Ehis D’Greatest – Afrobeats singer and songwriter
- eLDee – rapper, singer, producer
- Emeka Nwokedi – conductor and music director
- Emma Nyra – R&B singer
- Emmy Gee – rapper
- Erigga – rapper
- Eva Alordiah – rapper and singer
- Evi Edna Ogholi – Reggae singer

== F ==
- Mike Falana – jazz trumpeter
- Falz – rapper, songwriter
- Faze – R&B singer
- Fela Kuti – Afrobeat, jazz singer-songwriter and instrumentalist
- Fela Sowande – musician and composer of Nigerian art music
- Femi Kuti – Afrobeat, jazz singer-songwriter and instrumentalist
- Fireboy DML – singer
- Flavour N'abania – highlife and hip-hop singer
- Frank Edwards – gospel singer
- Fransax

== G ==
- Genevieve Nnaji – pop singer
- GoodGirl LA – singer
- Greatman Takit – singer

== H ==
- Helen Parker-Jayne Isibor – opera singer and composer
- Harrysong – singer and songwriter
- Haruna Ishola – apala musician
- Humblesmith – Afropop singer

== I ==
- I.K. Dairo – Jùjú musician
- Ice Prince – rapper
- Ifé (musician) – singer and songwriter
- Idahams – singer and songwriter
- Eedris Abdulkareem – hip-hop singer
- Iyanya – pop singer
- Ikechukwu – singer, rapper and actor

== J ==
- J. Martins – highlife singer-songwriter and record producer
- Jamopyper – musician
- Jaywon – singer and songwriter
- Jesse Jagz – rapper
- Jasën Blu – R&B singer-songwriter and record producer
- Joeboy – singer
- Joe El – singer
- Johnny Drille – singer
- John Okafor – actor and comedian
- Justina Lee Brown – singer and songwriter

== K ==
- K1 De Ultimate – Fuji musician
- Kcee – singer and songwriter
- Kefee – Gospel singer
- Khaid – Afropop, R&B
- Kida Kudz – Afropop and songwriter
- King Perryy – Singer and songwriter
- King Wadada – Reggae singer
- Kizz Daniel – singer and songwriter
- Koker – singer and songwriter
- Korede Bello – singer and songwriter
- Kheengz – rapper

== L ==
- Ladipoe – rapper and singer
- Lagbaja – singer and songwriter
- Lara George – gospel singer
- Laycon – rapper, singer and songwriter
- Lil Kesh – rapper and singer
- Lyta – singer
- Llona – singer and songwriter

== M ==
- M.I – rapper
- M Trill – rapper
- Made Kuti – Afrobeat musician
- Majek Fashek – singer and songwriter
- May7ven – singer and songwriter
- May D – singer and songwriter
- Mayorkun – singer and songwriter
- Maud Meyer – jazz singer
- Mercy Chinwo – gospel musician
- Mike Ejeagha – highlife musician
- Mo'Cheddah – hip-hop singer
- Mode 9 – rapper
- Monica Ogah – pop singer and songwriter
- Mr 2Kay – singer and songwriter
- Mr Eazi – singer and songwriter
- Mr Raw – rapper
- Mr Real – house singer
- Muma Gee – pop singer-songwriter
- Muna – rapper

== N ==
- Naeto C – rapper
- Naira Marley – singer and songwriter
- Neon Adejo – gospel singer
- Niniola – Afro-house artist
- Niyola – soul and jazz singer
- Nkem Owoh – actor, comedian and singer
- Nneka – hip-hop and soul singer
- Nonso Amadi – musician
- Nonso Bassey – musician, actor and model
- Nosa – gospel artist

== O ==
- Obongjayar – singer
- Obesere – fuji musician
- Obiwon – R&B and gospel singer
- Odumodublvck – rapper and hip-hop artist
- Olamide – rapper and hip-hop artist
- Oliver De Coque – Igbo highlife musician
- Oluwa Toyo – singer, songwriter
- Omawumi – soul singer
- Omah Lay – singer and songwriter
- Joseph Omotoye – body music
- Omotola Jalade Ekeinde – R&B and pop singer
- Onyeka Onwenu – pop singer
- Orezi – reggae singer
- Oriental Brothers – orchestra highlife band
- Oritse Femi – singer and songwriter
- Orits Williki – Reggae singer
- Orlando Julius – singer and saxophonist
- Oshara – singer and songwriter
- Osita Osadebe – Igbo highlife musician
- Orlando Owoh – highlife musician
- Oxlade – afro-fusion, R&B
- Muraina Oyelami – dùndún and Batá drummer

== P ==
- P-Square – hip-hop, R&B, Afropop
- Patience Ozokwor – highlife singer
- Patoranking – Afrobeats and reggae and dancehall singer
- Paul Play Dairo – R&B Singer
- Pepenazi – rapper, hip-hop artist and record producer
- Pericoma Okoye – singer and songwriter
- Peruzzi – singer
- Peter King – Afrobeat and jazz multi-instrumentalist
- Phyno – rapper and record producer
- Pheelz – Singer and record producer
- Praiz – R&B singer and songwriter
- Prettyboy D-O – Recording artist
- Prince Nico Mbarga
- PsychoYp – Rapper
- Pasuma – Fuji Musician

== Q ==
- Qdot – musician and songwriter

== R ==
- Ras Kimono – Reggae artist
- Reekado Banks – hip-hop artist
- Rema – Afrobeat and trap singer and songwriter
- Reminisce – rapper
- Rex Lawson – highlife musician
- Ric Hassani – singer and songwriter
- Ruby Gyang – singer and songwriter
- Ruger (singer) – singer and songwriter
- Ruggedman – rapper and hip-hop artist
- Runtown – songwriter and hip-hop artist
- Remi Aluko – Fuji musician

== S ==
- Sade Adu – singer and songwriter
- Safin De Coque – rapper and hip-hop artist
- Saheed Osupa – Fuji musician
- Salawa Abeni – Waka singer
- Samsong – gospel singer
- Sarz – producer and musician
- Sasha P – rapper and singer
- Sean Tizzle – Afropop
- Seun Kuti – Afrobeat, jazz singer-songwriter and instrumentalist
- Seyi Shay – pop singer and songwriter
- Seyi Vibez – Afrobeat singer and songwriter
- Slimcase (singer) – recording artist and singer
- Shallipopi – Singer and rapper
- Shekx – pop singer and songwriter
- Shina Peters – juju singer
- Simi – singer and songwriter
- Sinach – gospel singer
- Skales – rapper and singer
- Shola Allynson – Gospel Singer
- Small Doctor – Afrobeats recording artist
- Somadina – Afropop singer-songwriter
- Sonny Okosuns – musician
- Sound Sultan – rapper, singer and songwriter
- Spyro – singer and songwriter
- Stella Damasus – R&B and soul singer
- St. Seií – pop singer and songwriter
- Strei – afrobeats and afromood singer and songwriter
- Sunny Ade – jùjú singer
- Sunmisola Agbebi – gospel singer and songwriter

== T ==
- Tamara Jones – R&B singer-songwriter
- Tekno Miles – Afropop singer-songwriter and producer
- Tems – singer
- Teni – singer and songwriter
- Terry G – rapper, singer and songwriter
- The Cavemen – highlife band
- Timaya – reggae singer
- Tiwa Savage – R&B and pop singer-songwriter
- Timi Dakolo – singer and winner of Idol West Africa (2007)
- Toby Foyeh – guitarist
- Tomi Favored – gospel artiste
- Tonto Dikeh – pop singer
- Tony Allen – drummer, composer and songwriter
- Tony Tetuila – rapper, singer and songwriter
- Tonye Garrick – R&B singer-songwriter
- Tope Alabi-gospel singer
- Tunde King – Jùjú musician
- Tunde Nightingale – singer and guitarist
- Tunji Oyelana – highlife musician and band leader
- TY Bello – gospel singer

== V ==
- Victor Olaiya – composer
- Victor Uwaifo – musician and musical instrument inventor
- Vict0ny – musician
- Vudumane – singer, rapper and songwriter

== W ==
- Waconzy – pop singer
- Waje – singer
- Wasiu Alabi Pasuma – film actor and Fuji musician
- Wasiu Ayinde Barrister – Fuji musician
- Weird MC – rapper
- William Onyeabor – funk musician
- Wizkid – pop singer
- Wurld – Electro fusion

== Y ==
- Yarden – afrofusion singer
- Ycee – rapper
- Yemi Alade – R&B and pop singer
- Yinka Ayefele – gospel singer
- Yinka Davies – jazz singer
- Young Jonn – singer, producer, Afrobeats
- Yung6ix – rapper
- Yusuf Olatunji – Sakara drum player

== Z ==
- Zerrydl – rapper and singer
- Zlatan – singer
- Zayn Africa – singer
- Zinoleesky – singer
- Zoro – rapper
- Zule Zoo – group

== See also ==
- Music of Nigeria
