= The Year of R'n'B =

Studio album by Capital F.E.M.I
- Released: 24 August 2012
- Genre: R&B
- Length: 64:23
- Label: Kennis Music
- Producer: Masterkraft; Sarz; Surefire Music Group; Tee-Y Mix; Hakim Abdulsamad; Jay Sleek

Singles from The Year of R'n'B
- 1. "Never Felt a Love"; 2. "Baby I Got It" Released: 24 March 2010; 3. "Capital F.E.M.I" / "Playlist" Released: 2 February 2011; 4. "In the Name of Love" Released: 8 August 2011; 5. "Get Low" Released: 12 February 2012; 6. "Don't Let Go" Released: 11 June 2012; 7. "I Found My Wife" Released: 4 February 2013

The Year of R'n'B is the debut studio album by Nigerian singer Capital F.E.M.I It was released on 24 August 2012 by Kennis Music and features guest appearances from Jaywon, Sauce Kid, Joe EL, Gbenga Adeyinka, Kenny Ogungbe, Eedris Abdulkareem, and Poka Face. Production was handled by Masterkraft, Sarz, Surefire Music Group, Tee-Y Mix, Hakim Abdulsamad, and Jay Sleek. It was supported by the singles "Never Felt a Love", "Baby I Got It", "Capital F.E.M.I", "Playlist", "In the Name of Love", "Get Low", "Don't Let Go", and "I Found My Wife".

== Singles ==
F.E.M.I's debut single "Never Felt a Love" was released as the album's lead single. Produced by Surefire Music Group, it earned Capital F.E.M.I a nomination for Best R&B Single at the 2010 edition of the Hip Hop World Awards. The second single "Baby I Got It" featuring Eedris Abdulkareem was released on 24 March 2010. It was produced by Masterkraft and received a nomination for Best R&B Single and won Best Vocal Performance (Male) at the 2011 edition of the Headies. "Capital F.E.M.I" and "Playlist" were released on 2 February 2011 as the dual third singles respectively. They were produced by Masterkraft. The fourth single off the album, "In the Name of Love", was released on 8 August 2011. It was produced by Tee-Y Mix. The album's fifth single "Get Low" was released on 12 February 2012 and was produced by Sarz. The sixth single "Don't Let Go" was released on 8 June 2012. It was produced by Hakim Abdulsamad. The seventh and final single "I Found My Wife" was released on 4 February 2013 and was co-written and produced by Hakim Abdulsamad.

== Critical reception ==
Professional ratings
Review scores
Source	Rating
tooXclusive	4/5 stars
Nigerian Entertainment Today	4/5 stars
360nobs	7.2/10

Ogagus of tooXclusive rated the album a 4 out of 5, describing it as “a stellar 17-track LP filled with mid-tempo R&B love ballads” and praising its commitment to authentic R&B. Tracks like “Never Felt a Love” were highlighted as “arguably the best R&B number released in these shores,” showcasing F.E.M.I's vocal prowess and artistry. Ayomide Tayo of Nigerian Entertainment Today also rated The Year of R’n’B by Capital F.E.M.I 4 out of 5, describing it as “one of the properly delivered albums of 2012” with a strong theme that “R ‘n’ B is here to stay.” While noting a few missteps like “Am a Star,” the review praised F.E.M.I's versatility, standout tracks like “I Found My Wife” and “If”, and his ability to blend classic R&B with elements appealing to a Nigerian audience. A writer for 360nobs that goes by the moniker ShadeNonConformist described The Year of R 'N' B by Capital F.E.M.I as a strong debut album that showcases his versatility and ability to deliver quality R&B while exploring other genres. She praised the stellar production and standout tracks like "Baby I Got It (Money, Money)" and "Duro Timi", concluding, "This is definitely one of the best R 'N' B albums of the year." The album received a 7.2/10 rating.

== Track listing ==
The Year of R'n'B track listing
No.	Title	Writer(s)	Producer(s)	Length
1.	"Capital F.E.M.I"	Femi Adeyinka	Masterkraft	3:30
2.	"Get Low"	Adeyinka	Sarz	3:14
3.	"Baby I Got It (Money Money)" (featuring Eedris Abdulkareem)	Adeyinka; Eedris Abdulkareem	Masterkraft	4:11
4.	"Am Just Saying" (featuring Jaywon and Sauce Kid)	Adeyinka; Oluwajuwonlo Iledare; Babalola Falemi	Masterkraft	4:08
5.	"Duro Timi"	Adeyinka		3:50
6.	"If"	Adeyinka		4:04
7.	"Dial My Heart" (featuring Poka Face)	Adeyinka; Joshua Utietie		4:03
8.	"Never Felt a Love"	Adeyinka; Melvin Brown; Jared Hancock; Saxon Lamont	Surefire Music Group	2:58
9.	"In the Name of Love"	Adeyinka	Tee-Y Mix	3:58
10.	"Don't Be Afraid"	Adeyinka		4:40
11.	"I Found My Wife"	Adeyinka; Hakeem Abdulsamad; Kenny Ogungbe	Hakim Abdulsamad	3:11
12.	"Everything" (featuring Gbenga Adeyinka)	Adeyinka		3:55
13.	"Don't Let Go"	Adeyinka; H. Abdulsamad; Bilal Abdulsamad; Ogungbe	Hakim Abdulsamad	3:36
14.	"Playlist"	Adeyinka	Masterkraft	3:56
15.	"Am A Star" (featuring Joe EL)	Adeyinka; Joel Amadi	Jay Sleek	3:52
16.	"Black and Beautiful" (featuring Kenny Ogungbe)	Adeyinka; Ogungbe	Masterkraft	4:16
17.	"OMG (Oh My God)"	Adeyinka; H. Abdulsamad; Ogungbe	Hakim Abdulsamad	3:56
Total length:				64:23

== Release history ==
Release history and formats for The Year of R'n'B
Region	Date	Format	Label
Various	24 August 2012	CD; digital download	Kennis Music
