= List of Nigerian rappers =

The following is a list of notable rap music artists from Nigeria.

== A ==
- A-Q (born 1986), rapper and songwriter
- Alpha Ojini (born 1992), rapper
- Eedris Abdulkareem (born 1974), rapper and singer
- Eva Alordiah (born 1989), rapper and make-up artist

== B ==
- Andre Blaze (born 1983), radio personality, rapper, television host and producer
- Blaqbonez (born 1996), rapper and singer

== C ==
- CDQ (born 1985), rapper and songwriter
- Chinko Ekun (born 1993), rapper and songwriter

== D ==
- Da Emperor (born 1993), rapper, actor, and songwriter
- Da Grin (1984 – 2010), rapper
- D'banj (born 1980), singer, rapper and television personality
- Dr SID (born 1980), rapper and singer
- Durella, artist, performer and songwriter
- DJ AB (born 1993), rapper, singer, songwriter and record producer
- Dice Ailes (born 1996), rapper and singer

== E ==
- ELDee (born 1977), rapper
- Emmy Gee (born 1986), rapper
- Erigga (born 1987), rapper and singer
- Efe (born 1993), rapper, singer, songwriter, and record producer

== F ==
- Falz (born 1990), rapper, songwriter and actor

== G ==
- Greatman Takit (born 1992), songwriter, singer and artist

== I ==
- Ice Prince (born 1986), rapper
- Illbliss, rapper and actor
- IllRymz (born 1985), television host, radio personality, writer, producer and rapper
- Ikechukwu, actor, rapper, and singer

== J ==
- Jesse Jagz (born 1984), rapper, record producer, and songwriter
- Ian Jazzi (born 1986), artist, record producer and actor

== K ==
- Kheengz (born 1992), rapper and actor

== L ==
- Ladipoe, rapper and singer
- Laycon (born 1993), rapper, singer, songwriter and media personality
- Lil Kesh (born 1999), rapper and singer
- Lyrikal (born 1983), rapper, record producer, and songwriter

== M ==
- M.I Abaga (born 1981), rapper and record producer
- M-Trill (born 1978 or 1979), rapper
- Mo'Cheddah (born 1990), rapper and singer
- Mode 9 (born 1975), rapper

== N ==
- Naeto C, rapper, Afrobeat artist and record producer

== O ==
- Olamide (born 1989), singer and producer
- Odumodublvck (born 1993), rapper
- Omah Lay (born 1997), rapper and singer

== P ==
- Pepenazi (born 1988), singer-songwriter and preacher
- Phyno (born 1986), rapper and singer

== R ==
- Reminisce (born 1981), singer, rapper, songwriter, and actor
- Ruggedman, rapper
- Rema (born 2000), rapper and singer

== S ==
- Skales (born 1991), rapper
- Sasha P (born 1983), rapper, musician, businesswoman and lawyer
- Staqk G (born 1996), rapper

== V ==
- Vector (born 1984), rapper, singer and songwriter
- Vudumane, singer, rapper and songwriter

== W ==
- Weird MC (born 1970), rapper

== Y ==
- Ycee (born 1993), rapper
- Yung6ix (born 1989), rapper
