= 2012 in African music =

The following is a list of events and releases that have happened or are expected to happen in 2012 in African music.

== Events ==
- date unknown
  - Johnny Clegg receives the Order of Ikhamanga, Silver - the highest honour a citizen can receive in South Africa - as part of the National Orders ceremony. The award is presented by President Jacob Zuma.
  - Tats Nkonzo gains recognition for his musical contributions to the eNews Channel's satirical news show Late Nite News with Loyiso Gola

== Albums released in 2012 ==
Release date	Artist	Album	Genre	Label
January 31	Hugh Masekela	Jabulani		Gallo Record Company
April 30	2Face Idibia	Away & Beyond	Afrobeats, reggae, dancehall, hip-hop, soul	Hypertek
May 8	Mavin Records	Solar Plexus	Afrobeats	Mavin
June 1	E.L	Something ELse	Azonto, hip-hop	Akwaaba
June 18	Empire Mates Entertainment	Empire Mates State of Mind	Afropop, reggae, R&B, pop	EME
July 1	eLDee	Undeniable	Afropop, hip-hop	Trybe
July 17	Davido	Omo Baba Olowo	Afrobeats, hip-hop	HKN
August 24	Capital F.E.M.I	The Year of R'n'B	R&B	Kennis
October 1	Ike Moriz	Siren Terpsichore	Swing, jazz, Latin	Mosquito Records London Pty Ltd.
October 2	Youssou N'Dour	From Senegal to the World (compilation album)		Nascente
November 5	D'Prince	Frenzy!	Afro pop	Mavin
November 12	Olamide	YBNL	Hip-hop	YBNL
November 15	Brymo	The Son of a Kapenta	Afropop, fuji, soul, EDM, R&B, contemporary pop, techno	Chocolate City
November 30	Illbliss	Oga Boss	Afrobeats, hip-hop, Igbo rap	Capital Hill, The Goretti Company

== Musical films ==
- Zambezia (animation), with music by Bruce Retief

== Deaths ==
- January 17 – Mohamed Rouicha, 61, Moroccan folk singer
- February 18 – Mohammed Wardi, 79, Sudanese singer and songwriter
- April 8 – George Wilberforce Kakoma, 89, Ugandan musician, composer of the Ugandan national anthem
- November 30 – Kélétigui Diabaté, 81, Malian musician

== See also ==
- 2012 in music
