= Kenny Ogungbe =

- Also known as: Kenny, Keke Ogungbe, Kekeke, Baba Keke
- Born: Kehinde Ogungbe; 10 September 1960
- Genres: Hip hop, RnB
- Occupations: Producer, radio presenter, CEO of the Kennis Music
- Years active: 1994–present
- Label: Kennis Music
- Website: ng.linked.com

Kehinde "Kenny" Ogungbe, is a Nigerian DJ, music producer, television presenter and music executive. He is the founder and eponym of the label Kennis Music, and is the CEO alongside Dayo "D1" Adeneye. He owns Kennis 104.1 F.M, Lagos.

== Career ==
Together with Dayo Adeneye also known as D1, he hosted the music programme AIT Jamz, which aired on AIT in the late nineties (later becoming PrimeTime Jamz on NTA).

He has worked with, shaped the careers of, or discovered The Remedies (launching the solo careers of both Eedris Abdulkareem and Tony Tetuila), Sound Sultan, 2face Idibia (producing his first two solo albums) and Oritse Femi, among others.

In 2012, he was appointed Managing Director of Raypower FM. He is also Non Executive Director, DAAR Communications Plc. He was a coach at Naija Star Search show.

== Controversy ==
When he served as the general manager of Raypower and African Independent Television, he faced accusations of promoting tribalism within the Nigerian music industry during the 90s. This same accusation was recently reiterated to the news media by the renowned Nigerian-American musician, Aguike.

== Selected discography ==
(As producer)

- Face 2 Face
- Grass 2 Grace
