= Oba Orin =

Studio album by Jaywon
- Released: 5 April 2016
- Genre: Afrobeats
- Length: 78:08
- Label: Next World Music
- Producer: Mr Ejor; Ben Jossy; Blaq Jerzee; TMode; Young Jonn; Metro on D Beat; Weird One; Psalm Jazzy; Luminary Beat

Jaywon chronology
This Year (Odun Yi) (2014)	Oba Orin (2016)	Aje the Mixtape (2020)

Singles from Oba Orin
- 1. "Madantin (Remix)" Released: 4 April 2014; 2. "Back to Sender" Released: 26 December 2014; 3. "Okun United" Released: 10 October 2015; 4. "Gbawo" Released: 19 October 2015; 5. "Jolly Muke" Released: 24 February 2016; 6. "Kule Lori" Released: 7 April 2016; 7. "Champion (Akogun)" Released: 22 April 2016

Oba Orin (Yoruba: King of Music) is the third studio album by Nigerian singer Jaywon. It was released on 5 April 2016 by Next World Music. The album features guest appearances from Seriki, May D, Sojay, Stormrex, Olamide, Obesere, Reekado Banks, Kefchild, Kris D'razor, Eddy Kaddie, Reminisce, Mode 9, 9ice,Tiwa Savage, FMG, Vector, Phyno, Small Doctor, Cayana, YQ, and Oritse Femi. Jaywon enlisted production from Mr Ejor, Ben Jossy, Blaq Jerzee, TMode, Young Jonn, Metro on D Beat, Weird One, Psalm Jazzy, and Luminary Beat. Oba Orin serves as a follow-up to This Year (Odun Yi) (2015).

== Background ==
Following the expiration of his contract with Kennis Music, Jaywon parted ways with the label in 2013 and established his own imprint, Next World Music. The split followed reports of a dispute, with Jaywon reportedly offering to buy out his contract, prompting Kennis Music to urge broadcasters to stop airing his songs until the matter was resolved. Although Jaywon declined to disclose full details, he emphasized his preference to avoid controversy and affirmed that there were no legal issues after the separation. He took creative control under his new label, releasing music independently in the lead-up to Oba Orin.

== Singles ==
The album's lead single is the remix to Jaywon's hit single "Madantin" which features Phyno, May D, and Olamide. Produced by Blaq Jerzee, the song was released on 4 April 2014. The music video for "Madantin"'s remix was released on 4 December 2014, and features cameo appearances from Young John and Minjin. Olamide's verse was removed for an unknown reason. The Vector-assisted "Back to Sender" was released as the album's second single. It was produced by Blaq Jerzee, and its music video was directed by Clarence Peters and features guest appearances from various legendary musicians from the '70s to '90s. The third single "Okun United" features Next World Music act Kefchild and was released on 10 October 2015. Jaywon hails from the Okun tribe in Kogi State, located in Nigeria's central region, which is the reason behind "Okun United". "Gbawo" featuring YQ was released as the fourth single on 19 October 2015. It was produced by Young Jonn. The fifth single off the album, "Jolly Muke" featuring 9ice, was released on 24 February 2016. Its music video was directed by Unlimited L.A and was released on 29 March 2016. "Kule Lori" featuring Reminisce and Seriki was released on 7 April 2016 as Oba Orin's sixth single. It was produced by Young Jonn. The Metro on D Beat-produced seventh and final single "Champion (Akogun)" was released on 22 April 2016.

== Critical reception ==
Wilfred Okiche of 360nobs praised Oba Orin as a bold, versatile album that shows off Jaywon's strong vocals and deep roots in indigenous sounds. He called it “a fine collection of sounds that reflects Jaywon’s superior talent and the state of pop music.” Pulse Nigeria's Joey Akan rated Oba Orin a 3/5, applauding the album as a deeply personal and refreshingly honest album where Jaywon blends Yoruba pop with life lessons and heartfelt storytelling. He called it “personal and insightful,” concluding that "it’s like Jaywon performed personally for you, in a crowded local venue." Chiagoziem Onyekwena of Filter Free felt that Oba Orin was "5 songs better than Meet Jaywon was," but said it was "at least 5 songs too long," with growth that did not always match the length. He concluded that there was "a nice consistency to his music" and that Jaywon was "ageing well too, musically," rating the project 6.

== Track listing ==
Oba Orin track listing
No.	Title	Writer(s)	Producer(s)	Length
1.	"Intro" (featuring Kris D'razor)	—	Mr Ejor	1:47
2.	"PFM (Mama)" (featuring Mode 9)	Iledare; Babatunde Adewale	Ben Jossy	4:26
3.	"Back to Sender" (featuring Vector)	Iledare; Olanrewaju Ogunmefun	Blaq Jerzee	3:47
4.	"So Fun Won"	Iledare	T Mode	3:58
5.	"Kule Lori" (featuring Reminisce and Seriki)	Iledare; Remilekun Safaru; Ibiyemi Seriki	Young John	4:08
6.	"Skit" (featuring Eddy Kaddie)	—		0:24
7.	"Champion (Akogun)"	Iledare; Lapido	Metro on D Beat	4:13
8.	"FOG (Favour of God)"	Iledare	Young John	4:11
9.	"Gbadun" (featuring Reekado Banks)	Iledare; Ayoleyi Solomon	T-Mode	4:20
10.	"Back Home"	Iledare	Weird One	5:35
11.	"Jolly Muke" (featuring 9ice)	Alakija; Alexander Ajifolajifaola	Metro On D Beat	4:10
12.	"My Way" (featuring Tiwa Savage)	Iledare; Tiwatope Savage	T-Mode	3:52
13.	"Okun United" (featuring Kefchild)	Iledare; Olabayo Babatunde	Mr Ejor	5:17
14.	"Banuso" (featuring Oritse Femi)	Iledare; Oritsefemi Majemite Ekele	Benjossy	3:22
15.	"Skit" (featuring Cayana)	—		0:38
16.	"Paraga" (featuring Obesere and Small Doctor)	Iledare; Abass Akande Obesere; Adekunle Temitope	Mr Ejor	3:31
17.	"Show Me (Bami Tale)"	Iledare	Psalm Jazzy	4:47
18.	"Give Me" (featuring Stormrex)	Iledare; Yvonne Ogbogu	Luminary Beat	4:10
19.	"PFM (Mama)" (remix; featuring Sojay, Kefchild, and FMG)	Iledare; Samuel Okorie Jnr.; Babatunde; FMG	Benjossy	4:31
20.	"Gbawo" (featuring YQ)	Iledare; Yakub Jubril	Young John	3:32
21.	"Madantin" (remix; featuring Phyno, May D, and Olamide)	Iledare; Chibuzor Azubuike; Akinmayokun Awodumila; Olamide Adedeji	Blaq Jerzee	3:29

Notes

- "—" denotes a skit

== Personnel ==
Credits adapted from back cover.

- Mr Ejor — production (tracks 1, 13, 16), mixing (tracks 1, 5, 7, 10, 11, 12, 13, 16, 17)
- Benjossy — production (tracks 2, 14, 19), mixing (track 2, 19)
- Blaq Jerzee — production (tracks 3, 21)
- T-Mode — production (tracks 4, 9, 12)
- Young John — production (tracks 5, 8, 20)
- Metro On D Beat — production (tracks 7, 11)
- Weird One — production (track 10)
- Psalm Jazzy — production (track 17), mixing (track 2)
- Luminary Beats — production (track 18)
- One Plus — mixing (track 3)
- Indomix — mixing (tracks 4, 8, 9, 14, 18), mastering (all tracks)
- Brain on the Mix — mixing (tracks 20, 21)

== Release history ==
Release history and formats for Oba Orin
Region	Date	Format	Label
Various	5 April 2016	CD; digital download	Next World Music
