= List of Nigerian musical groups =

This is a list of notable Nigerian musical groups. For individual musicians, see List of Nigerian musicians.

== B ==
- Bracket
- Bantu

== F ==
- The Funkees

== L ==
- Lijadu Sisters

== P ==
- P-Square
- Plantashun Boiz
- Port Harcourt Male Ensemble

== R ==
- Christian Rich
- The Remedies
- Rex Jim Lawson

== S ==
- Skuki
- Styl-Plus
- SHiiKANE

== T ==
- Trybesmen
- Twins Affair

== W ==
- Wunmi

== See also ==
- Category:Nigerian musical groups
- Category:Nigerian record labels
- Category:Music festivals in Nigeria
