= Bisk (singer) =

- Born: Victor Obinna Phillips; Lagos state
- Genres: Afrobeats, Afrofusion
- Occupations: Singer, songwriter
- Instrument: Vocals
- Years active: 2016–present
- Label: Swiissh Music

Victor Obinna Phillips, known professionally as Bisk, is a Nigerian singer/songwriter and Performing artist. He is known for establishing Swiissh Music a Nigerian-based Record Label.

== Early life ==
Bisk was born in Lagos, Nigeria, where he attended Chrisland School in Ikeja for primary education and later pursued secondary education at The Bells in Ogun State, Nigeria and Model College in Ikorodu, Lagos state, he also attended Northeast College Tottenham London in Tottenham, London. He had a keen interest in Afrobeat music from a young age. Growing up in a household filled with the rich sounds of African highlife, reggae, pop, and R&B, he developed a keen ear for diverse genres. In a candid interview with The Guardian, he said “he credits his father, an avid music enthusiast, for instilling in him a deep appreciation for music and introducing him to the works of legendary Nigerian musician Fela Kuti.

== Career ==
In 2016, the Afro-fusion singer/songwriter. He launched his music career as a Musician on Spotify as Bisk, while based in Tottenham, England, just after a collaboration project with Nigerian musician P Dubb titled “Girl dem know” where he was featured as a guest artist. In 2016 Bisk released his debut single, “Electrifyin.”

On the 19 July 2016, he released another solo project titled “I No Send.”

=== Swiissh Music ===
Bisk is known for swiissh music. Swiissh Music was born as a platform dedicated to nurturing and promoting promising Nigerian artists with a focus on musical versatility and cross-genre collaborations. The label aims to push boundaries and redefine the Nigerian music landscape. The Label is home to P Dubb, a Nigerian musician and songwriter.

== Discography ==
- Electrifyin – 2016
- I No Send – 2016
- Jaga Jaga – 2023
- Girl dem know – 2015
