= Joe EL =

Nigerian singer, songwriter and performer

- Also known as: Joe El, Joe-El, Joe Everlasting
- Born: Joel Amadi Didam; Sokoto, Sokoto State, Nigeria
- Genres: Afrobeats; R&B; hip hop
- Occupations: Singer; Songwriter; Musical performer
- Instrument: Vocals
- Years active: 2006–present
- Label: Kennis Music

Joel Amadi, known as Joe EL, (born 23 March) is a Nigerian afrobeat singer, songwriter, and performer, signed with Kennis Music. In 2006, he participated in the Star Quest singing competition in Jos and later on in the annual Kennis Music Easter fiesta.

== Family and education ==
Joel Amadi was born to the Amadi Didam family in Sokoto, Sokoto State. He, however, grew up in Kano State. His father came from Zikpak, Kafanchan, Southern Kaduna State, and his mother from Otukpa, Benue State. After his primary education at Ramat Nursery and Primary School, he attended Army Day Secondary School, Bukavo Barracks, Kano State, from where after he graduated, and subsequently decided to proceed to study at the Kaduna State College of Education, Kafanchan (which is affiliated to the University of Jos), graduating in the year 2005 with a diploma in Accounting and Auditing.

Several news-media reported the songwriter posting on 24 July 2020 about the murder of his father (brother to the late monarch, Agwam Musa Didam, Agwam Fantswam I alongside the late monarch's wife) by Fulani herdsmen in his hometown, expressing his sadness and disappointment on the governor's handling of security in the state. Speaking with The Guardian, he called on the federal and state government to speak up against the killings bedevilling the Southern part of his state.

== Musical career ==
Joe EL began his musical career in 2006, when he participated in the Star Quest singing competition which was his first TV appearance. In 2009, he moved to Lagos where he hoped for better chances. He eventually met Kenny Ogungbe, the CEO of Kennis Music who offered him a contract in 2010. His debut single "I No Mind" was later nominated for the Best R'n'b Video at the NMVA 2011 awards.

He achieved more popularity with his award-winning track "Bakololo" which was run Nigerian radio stations between 2011 and 2012. He also dropped songs such as: "Love song" and "Happy". With these songs, he toured about four states across the country, performing at the Glo Rock n Roll show, the Star Quest Grand Finale, the annual Kennis Music Easter Fiesta and other big stages.

He is often compared to 2Baba (also known as 2Face Idibia and TuFace), a Nigerian music legend, due to their facial resemblance. In 2014, he expressed his admiration for 2Baba, and also that he would like to collaborate with him. In 2014, Joe EL released the video of a song titled "Hold On" featuring 2Baba. The video was directed by Clarence Peters and produced by Grammy Award winning Hakim Abdulsamad. The video later got nominated for The Headies award for best collaboration in 2015.

In 2014, his song, "Oya Now" in which he featured Oritsefemi got another nomination for The Headies Best Collaboration Video award. He got two more nominations in the NMVA 2014 edition, one for his song, "You Are In Love" which was nominated for Best R'n'b Video category which was won by Niyola and the other for his new video "Oya Now" nominated for Best Video by A New Act which he won.

On 31 July 2015, Joe EL released his debut studio album Timeless through Kennis Music. It featured guest appearances from 2Face Idibia, Oritse Femi, Phyno, Iyanya, Terry G, B Howard, and J. Martins. Production was handled by OJB Jezreel, Hak Samadhi, Masterkraft, DJ Coublon, Mark Drummond, Terry G, Stunner Beats, and Solshyne. It was supported by the singles "I No Mind", "Bakololo", "Love Song", "You Are in Love", "Oya Now", "Hold On", "Ileke", "Onye (Eji Kolo)", "Chukwudi", and "No Yawa". The album's release party was hosted by 2Face Idibia at his nightclub Rumors Night Club in Festac, Lagos. Held on 6 August 2015, attendants include of Kenny Ogungbe, Olu Maintain, Kiss Daniel, Jaywon, Capital Femi, JJC, Dayo Adeneye, ID Ogungbe and a whole lot of other celebrities. Joey Akan of Pulse Nigeria criticized Timeless for lacking originality, direction, and creativity, describing it as "a drawn-out ode to 2face Idibia" with no lasting appeal. He noted that the album's tracks, including "Chukwudi" and "Ileke", felt uninspired and failed to deliver on the promise Joe EL showed earlier in his career. Akan concluded, "Nothing is timeless on this album," and expressed hope for improvement in a future release.

In 2019, he teamed up with Masterkraft to produce a dance song titled "Rawa" (Dance).

== Discography ==
=== Songs ===
- "Gbemisoke", 2016
- "Nwanyi Oma"
- "Keep Loving"
- "Yamarita" (featuring Olamide)
- "Chukwudi" (featuring Iyanya)
- "Celebrate" (featuring Yemi Alade)
- "Oya Now" (featuring Oritsefemi)
- "Rawa (dance)", 2019
- "Epo" (featuring Davido, Zlatan)

=== Albums ===
- Songs
- Hold On
- Timeless (2015)
- Do Good (2016)
- She Like Me
- Onye (Eji Kolo)
- You Are In Love
- I No Mind

=== Compilations featured ===
- "Bridal" (featuring Sound Sultan and Honorebel)
- Kennis Music All Starz Compilation (2011)

== Awards and nominations ==
| Year | Event | Prize | Recipient | Result | Ref |
|---|---|---|---|---|---|
| 2015 | The Headies | Award for Best Collaboration | "Hold On" (featuring 2Baba) | Nominated | |
| 2014 | The Headies | Award for Best Collaboration | "Oya Now" (featuring Oritsefemi) | Nominated | |
| 2014 | Nigerian Music Video Award (NMVA) | Best Video Award By A New Act | "Oya Now" (featuring Oritsefemi) | Won | |
| 2014 | Nigerian Music Video Award (NMVA) | Best Afro Beat Video | "Oya Now" (featuring Oritsefemi) | Nominated | |
| 2014 | Nigerian Music Video Award (NMVA) | Best RnB Video | "You Are In Love" | Nominated | |
| 2013 | The Most Finest Girl in Nigeria Beauty Pageant | Best New Act | Himself | Won | |
| 2013 | The Most Finest Girl in Nigeria Beauty Pageant | The Most Endorsed Artiste | Himself | Won | |
| 2012 | Kennis Music | The Most Laspotech celebrated Artiste of the year Award | Himself | Won | |
| 2011 | Nigerian Music Video Award (NMVA) | Best RnB Video Award | "I No Mind" | Nominated | |
