= Fahda Romie =

Jamaican dancehall singer and rapper (born 1993)

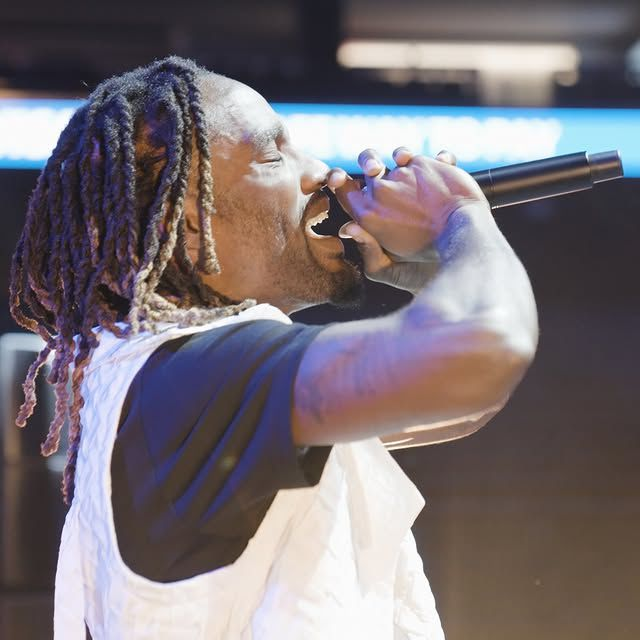
- Fahda Romie performing at the cocacola arena

Background information
- Born: Jerome Alva Dunn Downes; August 9, 1993 (age 33); May Pen, Clarendon, Jamaica
- Origin: Jamaica
- Genres: hip hop; melodic rap; trap; dancehall; reggae
- Occupations: Rapper; singer; songwriter
- Instrument: Vocal
- Years active: 2018–present

Fahda Romie (born Jerome Alva Dunn Downes, 9 August 1993) is a Jamaican rapper and songwriter, known for his 2020 EP ExtraGalactic Quasar which led to him being named as one of Jamaican's top YouTube artists of 2021.

== Early life ==
Fahda Romie was born Jerome Downes on 9 August 1993, and grew up in May Pen, Clarendon, Jamaica. He was raised by his grandparents from the age of 4 when his father relocated to the United Kingdom while his mother lived in the Cayman Islands. He attended May Pen Primary School and Knox High School in Spalding Clarendon, Denbigh High School in May Pen Clarendon, Denbigh High School 6th Form and College HEART College of Hospitality Services.

== Career ==
In 2017, Romie moved to Dubai to work in a restaurant. In November 2018, he started working as personal chef to Dubai-based Nigerian influencer and fraudster Hushpuppi.

Romie released his debut EP ExtraGalactic Quasar on 31 December 2020. On 25 May 2020, he was named as a Spotify RADAR artiste alongside singers Shenseea and Kranium. In 2021 Romie was named as one of the "hottest Jamaican rappers" and dancehall singers by the Nigerian Tribune newspaper and among five breakout Jamaican artists to watch in 2021 by The Guardian (Nigeria). On 30 December 2023, Fahda Romie opened for Sean Paul at the 2023 Coca-Cola Arena festival

On 11 May 2024, Fahda Romie opened performance for Shaggy at the Coca-Cola arena and in November 2024, he opened performance for Beenie Man at the Dubai's first carnival music festival "Butterfly Carnival" with Ruger

== Discography ==
=== EP ===
- ExtraGalactic Quasar

=== Singles ===
- "Weh Di F**k"
- "Whiplash"
- "Journey"
- "Recommend"
- "Intelligent Choppa (Hushpuppi)"
- "Anyday! feat. Seqwence"
- "Move yo Bombo feat. Lima"
- "Arctic Ocean"
- "Bonne Appetit"
- "Vortex Rocket Dub feat. Ryan Rasta Rocket Guzang"
- "Bonne Appetit" With St. Seii
