= Da Emperor =

Nigerian rapper and actor

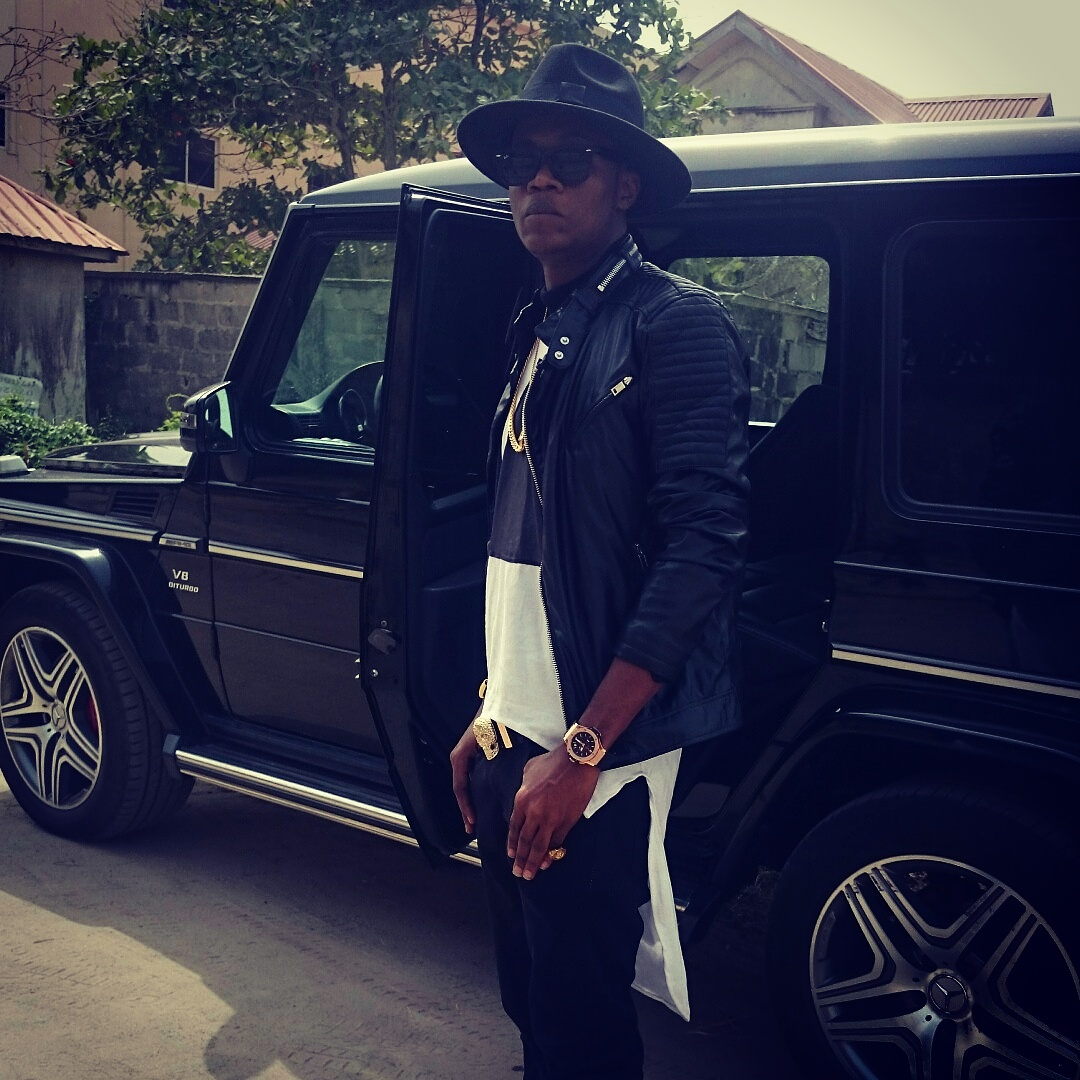
- Da Emperor standing beside his G wagon, 2015

Background information
- Born: Mobolaji Fasasi; Alagbado, Lagos, Nigeria
- Occupations: Rapper; songwriter; actor
- Years active: 2008–present
- Website: daemperor.com

Fasasi Mobolaji Gaius, known as Da Emperor, is a Nigerian indigenous rapper, actor, and songwriter. He has family roots in Ogun State, Nigeria. He raps in his native language, Yoruba, and infuses Pidgin and English. Da Emperor has recorded songs with artists such as Gabriel Afolayan, Small Doctor, and Oritse Femi.

He released his second official single titled "Firewood", which features vocals from Oritse Femi. This was followed by the singles "Shake it" and "I'm a Sinner".

Da Emperor was awarded the position of Tourism Ambassador on September 3, 2021, by the Bauchi State Tourism Board.

== Music career ==
In 2013, he collaborated with Canadian-based Jamaican reggae artist Kisco. Da Emperor has recorded music with established and up-and-coming artists. He has shared the stage with Davido and Tiwa Savage. In February 2013, he was featured on the song "Be Ma Boo" by Afro-Pop singer Slim Joe. In 2013, he released the single "Para Mode" mixed by Indomix; its music video has surpassed 100,000 YouTube views and was released in 2014.

On 2 February 2014, he released a song in support of Governor Akinwunmi Ambode's campaign. It was succeeded by the single "Liar", a cover of Chris Brown's "Loyal" featuring Lil Wayne and Tyga.

In May 2015, he teamed up with Oritse Femi to release the hit song "Firewood" mixed by indomix. On 12 February 2016, he released the widely accepted single "I'm a Sinner". On 5 March 2016, Da Emperor was involved in an international collaboration with American artist Stylezz and English artist Shyboss

Just a few days after he jumped on Olamide's "who u epp" song, Da Emperor's version hit the number 4 spot on Spotify, of Nigerian rapper Olamide ever released songs.

== Selected awards and nominations ==
The Polytechnic Ibadan "Honorary Award"

Year	Nominee / work	Award	Result	Ref.
2015	Da Emperor	Distinguished Emerging Act of the Year	Won	

Nigeria Achievers Awards

Year	Nominee / work	Award	Result	Ref.
2016	Da Emperor	Next Rated Act (Music)	Nominated	

City People Entertainment Awards

Year	Nominee / work	Award	Result	Ref.
2016	Da Emperor	Rookie of the Year	Nominated	

Emperor Nollywood Award "Recognition Award"

Year	Nominee / work	Award	Result	Ref.
2017	Da Emperor	Special Artist Recognition	Won	

Olabisi Onabanjo University, National Association Of Architecture Students "Honorary Award"

Year	Nominee / work	Award	Result	Ref.
2017	Da Emperor	Musician Of The Year	Won	

== Discography ==
As lead artist
Year	Title	Album
2011	"Am ah Rapper"	Non-album single
2011	"Facebook Prediction" (featuring Don d King)	Non-album single
2012	"J'ara E" (featuring Diamond Dee)	Non-album single
2013	"Para Mode"	R.I.V
2013	"Some Badt Guys"	R.I.V
2014	"Street is Strict" (featuring Gabriel Afolayan)	R.I.V
2014	"Ambode Campaign Song"	Non-album single
2014	"Liar"	Non-album single
2015	"Firewood" (featuring Oritse Femi)	R.I.V
2016	"I'm a Sinner"	R.I.V
2016	"Aganran" (featuring Small Doctor)	R.I.V

As featured artist
Year	Title	Album
2011	"Love Advice" (Don d King featuring Da Emperor)	Non-album single
2011	"Call Me Girl" (Ogun State All Stars featuring Dboy, Tnail, Tgirl, Don d King, and Da Emperor)	Ogun State All Stars
2012	"Front Page" (Holysam featuring Da Emperor)	Non-album single
2012	"Baby Baby" (Haybee featuring Da Emperor)	Non-album single
2013	"Fling It Gimme" (Kisco featuring Da Emperor)	Non-album single
2013	"Be Ma Boo" (Slimjoe featuring Da Emperor)	Non-album single
2013	"Calabash Booty" (Jefak featuring Da Emperor)	Non-album single
2014	"Alujo" (Ibromatic featuring Da Emperor)	Non-album single
2015	"No Love" (Lyrontray featuring Da Emperor)	Non-album single
2015	"Kogbagidi" (Ogbon featuring Da Emperor)	Non-album single
2016	"Shake it" (Shyboss and Stylezz featuring Da Emperor)	Non-album single
2016	"Who U Epp" (Olamide featuring Da Emperor)	Non-album single

== Videography ==
Year	Title	Album	Director	Ref
2014	"Para Mode"	R.I.V	Prince G Next	
2016	"I'm a Sinner"	R.I.V	Joe Rock	
2020	"I Love You"	R.I.V	Da Emperor	
2020	"Nathana (Booty Bounce)"	R.I.V	Da Emperor	

== See also ==
- List of Nigerian musicians
- List of Nigerian rappers
