= Jasën Blu =

Nigerian singer

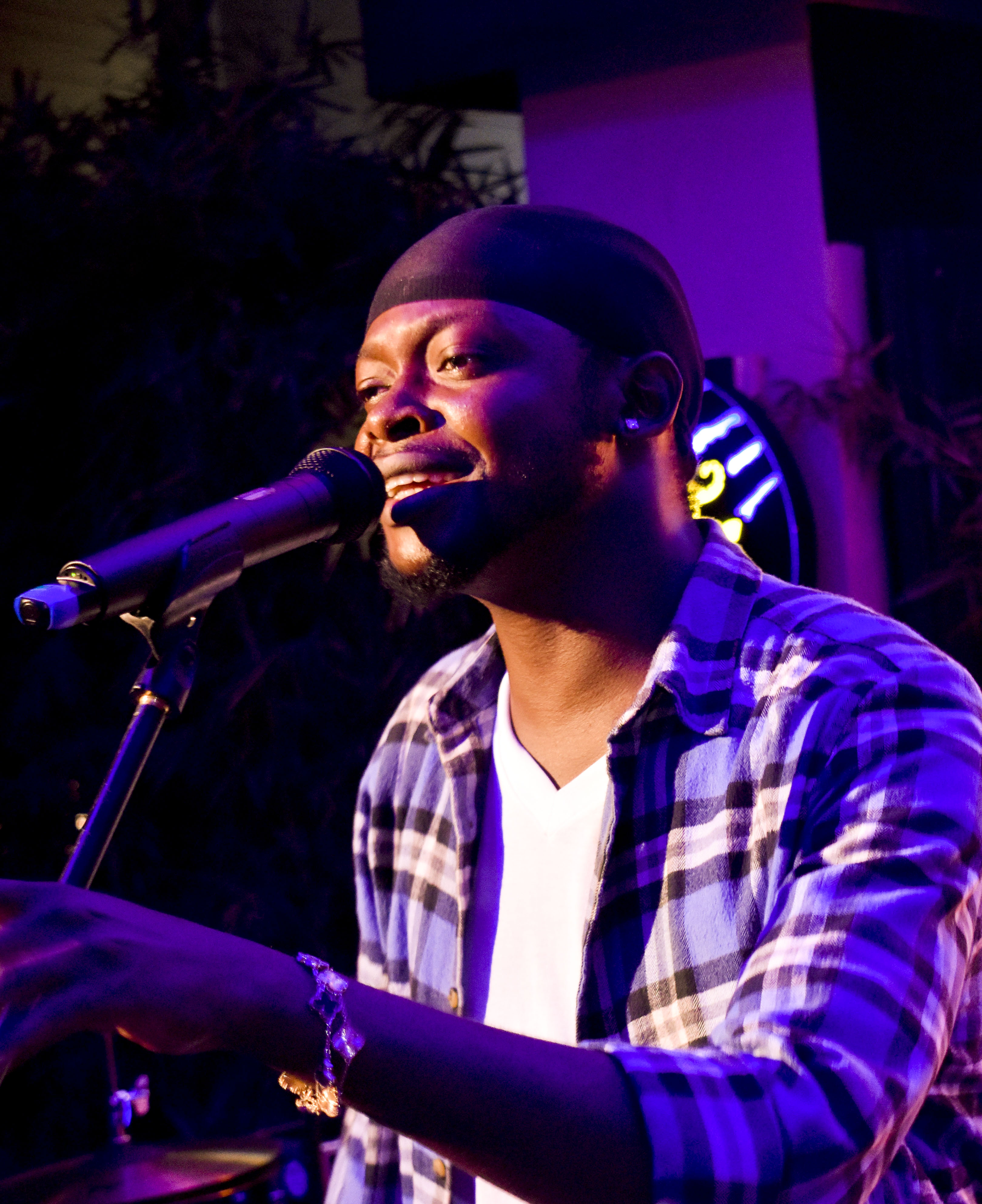
- Blu performing in 2023

Background information
- Origin: Akure, Nigeria
- Genres: R&B; soul; world; pop; Afrobeats
- Occupations: Singer; songwriter; record producer; composer
- Instruments: Vocals; drums; sampler
- Years active: 2007–present
- Label: Nubiana
- Website: https://jasenblu.com

Jasën Blu is a Nigerian singer, songwriter, record producer and score composer. His debut project, the Road 2 Soulwave EP was released in October 2020 after several unofficial releases as well as commercial singles which include "Already" (2017), "Brown Shuga" (2019), "Chill", and "BluFunk" (2023).

== Early life ==
Blu was born and raised in Akure, Nigeria. His first ever live performance was at age twelve, when he sang a mimed version of "Angel" by Shaggy to fellow students at his boarding house social gathering in secondary school.

== Education ==
Blu attended Federal University of Technology Akure from 2004 to 2009, studying Urban & Regional Planning while combining academics with music. After several demo recordings and back up vocal performances for other student artistes, he moved to Lagos in 2008 to further his music career.

== Career ==
Blu's first break came when his song "L.A.S.G.I.D.I. (Gidi Anthem)" was selected as lead soundtrack and trailer theme to Nigerian filmmaker Obi Emelonye's 2012 tragedy thriller, "Last Flight to Abuja", for which he gained considerable recognition due to the success of the film. He then had minor releases like "Song About You" while working on his debut album.

On Valentine's Day 2017, he released "Already", the lead single off his debut album and shortly after took to social media to announce the title of his impending debut album as Soulwave while continuing work on new material. He then followed up with "Brown Shuga", an Afro-fusion flavored remake of D'Angelo's 1995 hit, "Brown Sugar", which was well received by fans in Japan. Blu supported the release of "Brown Shuga" with several live performances, including an appearance as opening act at the 2019 edition of Seyi Sodimu's "Grown & Sexy" Concert, which saw him share the stage with top domestic and international R&B stars including Styl-Plus, Paul Play Dairo, Nigerian reggae legend Daddy Showkey, and the show headliner who has also been cited as Blu's musical influence, American R&B singer Joe. In 2020, Blu detoured from original plans of a full-length debut release and completed recording on his EP, Road 2 Soulwave, which was released in the rest of the world on 9 October, and released in Nigeria on 5 November 2020.

After a brief hiatus in 2021, Blu made a return to building up towards the release of the Soulwave LP in August 2022 with the non-album buzz single, "Otojometa" In March 2023, he released Soulwave's second official single, "Chill" via his independent record label, Nubiana. The season-themed third single, "Summertime" was released in July, which Blu hinted was inspired by hip-hop group Lost Boyz's 1997 song of the same name. The fourth single, a retro-pop and funk inspired record "BluFunk" was released in September 2023. In December, a remix of "BluFunk" dubbed the 'RockOut Remix' was released, featuring Nigerian Hip-Hop artist Hotyce, marking Blu's fourth and final release of 2023.

Late May 2024, Blu released "Faraway (My Heart Goes...)", a soul and R&B record that interpolates the chorus of Nigerian pop singer Tony Tetuila's hit, "My Heart Go Jigi Jigi", reinforcing Blu's hitherto reputation for paying homage to his favorite legacy stars through music.

== Other ventures ==
=== SoundQraft LLC ===
Blu founded and operates a music production outfit, SoundQraft LLC, via which he writes, produces and engineers all his own musical recordings as well as offering the same services to other musicians. He has also recorded original soundtracks and composed original music and sound designs to many Nollywood films, the first couple of which was Emelonye's Last Flight to Abuja (original soundtrack) and his Africa Magic original television series "The Calabash" (score composition and sound design) in 2014. He has since composed original scores and contributed recordings to a large number of Nollywood and other African feature films, shorts, television series and commercials, and has on occasions cited his works as a composer as one of the underlying factors for his delayed music releases.

== Discography ==
EPs

- Road 2 Soulwave (2020)
