= Shekx =

Nigerian singer-songwriter and record producer

- Born: Gimba Shekwolo Emmanuel; 24 June 1999 (age 26); Nasarawa State
- Genres: Afropop; Afro fusion; Afro-soul
- Occupations: Singer; songwriter; Mix Engineer
- Years active: 2020–present

Gimba Shekwolo Emmanuel (born 24 June 1999), known professionally as Shekx, is a Nigerian singer-songwriter and record producer. He gained recognition with his TikTok viral single “4AM”, which earned him his first chart entry on Nigeria TurnTable Top 50 single chart, debuted on the Spotify Viral Top 50 and trending Nigerian artistes on Audiomack across all genres in April 2023.

== Early life and education ==
Shekx was born and raised in Nasarawa State, Nigeria, on 24 June 1999. He attended school in the state and later furthered his education at the University of Jos. He began developing an interest in music during his childhood.

== Career ==
Shekx officially launched his music career with the release of his debut extended play titled Music & School in 2022 which debuts at 47 on Turntable Nigeria Top 50 Albums Chart. He was profiled as one of the promising young talents to watch and top 10 Hottest New Nigerian Artists of 2022 by The Sun He gained national attention with the release of "4AM", which became a viral hit and landed him on several trending charts. In January 2023, "4AM" broke into the Spotify Viral Top 50 in Nigeria. The single also debuted on the TurnTable Top 50 single chart. In 2024, he released follow-up singles like "Broke Boy" and "BADTIN (Acoustic)" In May 2023, he broke into the top 5 trending Nigerian artistes on Audiomack across all genres. In May 2024 he was ranked at number 5 on TurnTable's NXT Emerging Top Artistes for 10 weeks.

== Discography ==
=== EP ===
- Music & School

=== Single ===
- "4AM"
- "BrokeBoy"
- "BADTIN (Acoustic)"

== See also ==
- List of Nigerian musicians
