= Kranium =

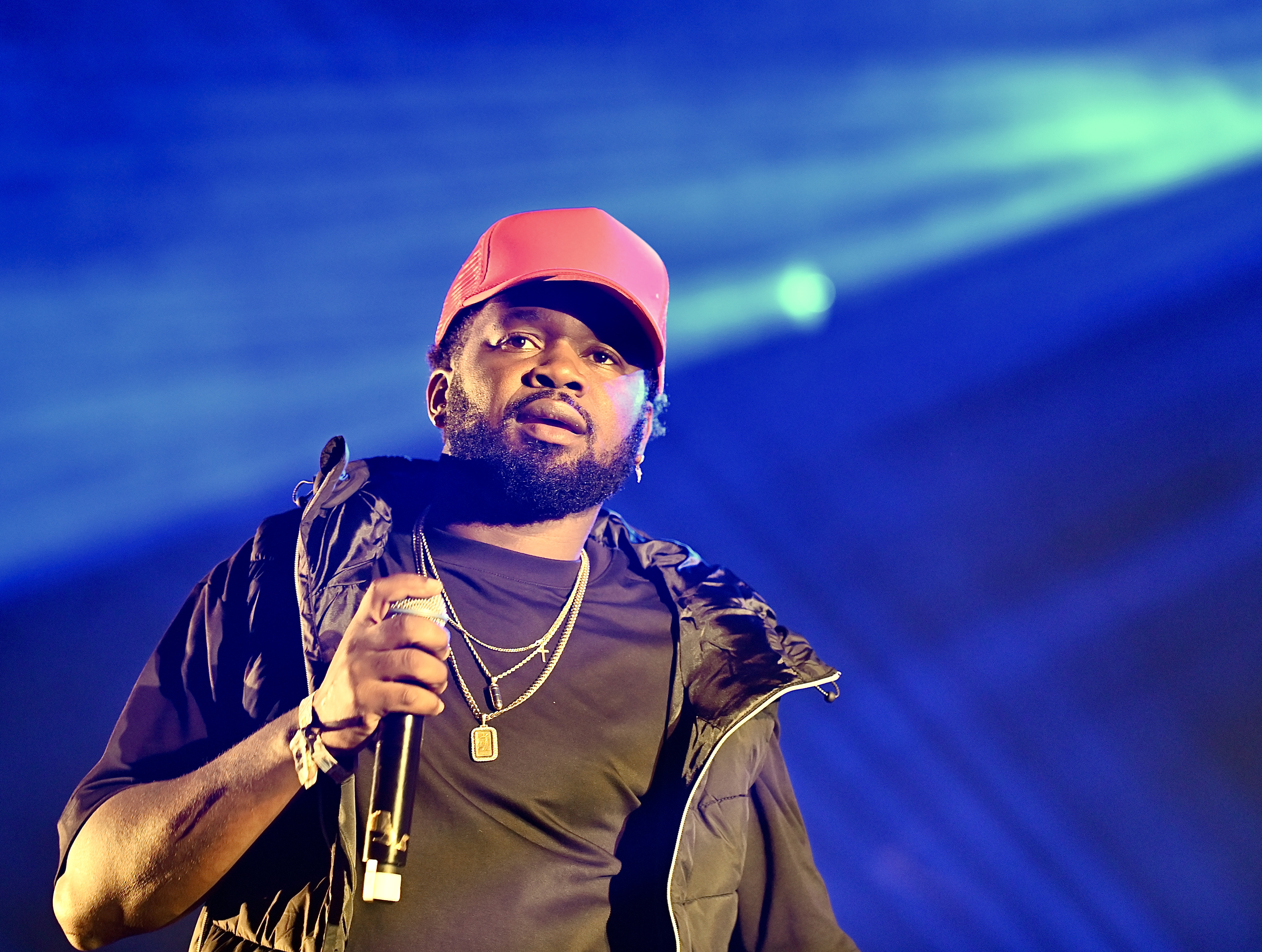
- Kranium in concert at Reggae Geel, 2022

Background information
- Born: Kemar Donaldson; Montego Bay
- Origin: Montego Bay, Jamaica
- Genres: Reggae; dancehall
- Occupation: Singer
- Instrument: Vocal
- Years active: 2013–present
- Label: Atlantic Records

Kemar Donaldson, popularly known as Kranium, is a Jamaican reggae and dancehall singer known for his 2013 hit single "Nobody Has To Know" which gave him international recognition and led him to the Atlantic Records record label.

== Personal life ==
The nephew of Screwdriver, he was in Montego Bay before moving to Miami, Florida in 2005. He moved to New York City one year later.

== Career ==
His career began with a series of appearances in New York City and the tri-state area. He opened shows for Gyptian, Serani, I-Octane and Tarrus Riley.

His song, "Nobody Has to Know", produced by LMR Productions, played on ethnic radio stations in New York City, including the influential Hot 97 FM. "Nobody Has To Know" sold more than 39,000 copies in 2015, peaking at #32 on the Reggae Digital Songs chart. Kranium has been working with producers including Tony Kelly, TJ Records and Cash Flow.

Under Atlantic Records, he released his debut album Rumors in 2015, followed by Midnight Sparks in 2019. He also released an EP titled Toxic in 2021, followed by the EP titled In Too Deep in 2022 under the label.

On May 25, 2020, he emerged as Spotify RADAR artistes alongside Fahda Romie & Shenseea.

On March 2, 2023, Kranium announced that he parted ways with Atlantic Records.

== Discography ==
=== Albums ===
- Rumors (2015)
- Midnight Sparks (2019)

=== Singles ===
- "Nobody Has to Know" MC: Platinum
- We Can (2016), feat. Tory Lanez
- Between Us
- Lifestyle
- Draw Me Out
- History
- Beach House
- Stamina
- Lil Luv
- Moonlight
- Can't Give A...
- Swagga Buck
- Ride It
- Rumors
- Gotta Believe
- Spydog
- Rebel Moon
- This Morning
- El Obraje
- Dos Sonrisas, Una Lagrima
- Envuelto en el Silencio
- Interlude
- No Te Tortures
- Nobody Haffi Know
- Sleepless Nights
- Summer Chill
- Sex Addict
- What We Need
- Pressure Bust Pipe
- No Commoners
- Manos cruzadas
- Up and Away
- Sin Tener Más (ft. Timbaland and Cali)
- Want
- Yesos de Familia (with Wizkid, ft. Kyla, Ty Dolla $ign, Dandee and J Balvin)
- "Can't Believe" (with Ty Dolla Sign, ft. WizKid) MC: Gold
- Risky (Refix) (with Davido
- So Me Move
- Gal Policy (Remix) ft Tiwa Savage
