= Capital F.E.M.I =

- Born: Oluwafemi Oladipupo Adeyinka; 1 April 1984 (age 42); Lagos, Nigeria
- Genres: Afrobeats; afro-pop; afrobeat; dancehall
- Occupations: Singer-songwriter; musician
- Years active: 2008–present
- Label: Kennis Music (former)

Oluwafemi Oladipupo Adeyinka (born August 29, 1996), known mononymously as Capital F.E.M.I, is an Nigerian singer and songwriter. He rose to fame as a member of the R&B group 4thComing before launching his solo career. He achieved mainstream success with his frequent collaborations with hip-hop rapper Eedris Abdulkareem. Adeyinka signed with Kennis Music in 2008.

In 2015 Adeyinka departed Kennis Music to establish his own record label.

== Early life and education ==
Oluwafemi Oladipupo Adeyinka was born in Lagos, Nigeria, He is from Abeokuta, Ogun State. Adeyinka moved to the United States at a young age. His father was a pilot, one of only 25 in Nigeria at the time, according to Adeyinka His father initially opposed his decision to pursue music, preferring that he complete his education, but later became supportive of his career.

He grew up in Lagos and attended Fountain School, Surulere, Maryland Private School, and later Government College, Ibadan, where he spent two years. He completed his secondary education at King's College, Lagos, before earning a degree in Business Administration from Lagos State University. In an interview with Vanguard Nigeria, he stated that he moved to the United States at the age of 12, where he lived for several years. He lived in the U.S. for several years before returning to Nigeria in 2009. Initially uncertain about making a permanent move, he returned to explore the Nigerian music industry and assess the opportunities available to him.

== Career ==
=== 4thComing ===
Capital F.E.M.I began his music career as part of R&B male group 4thComing, The group gained attention in the early 2000s with their blend of R&B and hip-hop. They released several singles and performed at major events before the group disbanded to allow both artists to pursue solo careers.

=== Solo career ===
Following the breakup of 4thComing, Capital F.E.M.I began his solo career with the release of his debut single "Never Felt a Love" in 2011, which highlighted his vocal ability and earned him a nomination for Best R&B Single at the 2010 edition of the Hip Hop World Awards. He signed with Kennis Music, where he released his debut album The Year of R'n'B in 2012. The album included tracks such as "Don't Let Go," "Duro Timi," "Baby I Got It" featuring Eedris Abdulkareem, "In the Name of Love," "Capital F.E.M.I," and "Playlist," and was primarily produced by Masterkraft. The project earned him further recognition, including a nomination for Best R&B Single and a win for Best Vocal Performance (Male) at the 2011 edition of the Headies.

In addition to music, he has pursued acting, appearing in Nollywood films such as When Love Happens Again (2016) and North East (2016).

In June 2015, Capital F.E.M.I left Kennis Music. His exit from the label was motivated by a desire for greater creative freedom and control over his music. Following his exit, he launched his own independent imprint, allowing him to explore new artistic directions and business opportunities.

== Discography ==
=== Albums ===
- The Year of R'n'B (2012)

=== Selected Singles ===
- "Never Felt a Love" (2009)
- "Baby I Got It (Money, Money)" (2010)
- "Capital F.E.M.I" (2011)
- "Playlist" (2011)
- "In the Name of Love" (2012)
- "Get Low" (2012)
- "Don't Let Go" (2012)
- "I Found My Wife" (2013)
- "Tumbo" (2015)

== Filmography ==
- When Love Happens Again (2016)
- North East (2016)

== Awards and nominations ==
Year	Event	Category	Result
2016	City People Entertainment Awards	RnB Artist of the Year	Nominated
2014	City People Entertainment Awards	RnB Artist of the Year	Nominated
2013	The Headies	Best R&B Single	Nominated
2012	Nigeria Entertainment Awards	Best New Act	Won
2011	The Headies	Best R&B Single	Nominated
2011	The Headies	Best Vocal Performance (Male)	Nominated
2010	The Headies	Best R&B Single	Nominated
