= Oshara =

Nigerian singer-songwriter, and producer

- Born: Sola Shittu; 4 November 1986 (age 39); Ikere-Ekiti, Ekiti State, Nigeria
- Occupations: Singer; songwriter; producer
- Instrument: Vocals
- Years active: 2011–present

Sola Shittu (born 4 November 1986) professionally known as Oshara, is a Nigerian singer-songwriter and producer known for his debut album, Sent: The Commission (2011). Since then, he has released Ten of Me (2021), and Highness (2022).

== Early life and education ==
Oshara was born on 4 November 1986 in Ikere-Ekiti, Ekiti State. While growing up, Oshara was inspired by his father who was a songito in the Kegite Club.

Oshara had his primary education at Adedewe Nursery & Primary School in Owo, Ondo State and his secondary education at Holy Child Catholic Secondary School and Omega Academy in Ado-Ekiti. He graduated from University of Ado-Ekiti.

== Career ==
Oshara was influenced by his father who was songito in the Kegite Club, Fela Kuti and Bob Marley. Before joining the music industry, Oshara worked as an actor, stand-up comedian and event anchor.

Oshara's debut album, Sent: The Commission was released in 2011. This was followed by Ten of Me (2021) to mark his ten years in the music industry and Highness in 2022.

In 2023, Oshara began releasing songs at the beginning of each month to welcome his listeners. Among these singles, "VibeRation" which was produced by TDurst which drumming from Joel with backup vocals and percussions from Ekiti State Ministry of Arts and Culture. The single has been described as "a track that blended humor, artistry, and traditional elements to perfection."

Oshara has collaborated on stage with King Sunny Ade, Sinach, Nathaniel Bassey, Adekunle Gold, Eedris Abdulkareem, Alibaba, Gbenga Adeyinka, Alabi Pasuma, Sola Allyson, Adewale Ayuba.

Oshara is the founder of Greenwave Productions, an audiovisual production company.

== Discography ==
Albums

- Sent: The Commission (2011)
- Ten of Me (2021)
- Highness (2022)

Singles

- "VibeRation"
