= Ayola =

Nigerian singer and songwriter (born 1992)

- Born: Abdullah Adeoye Abubakre; 9 December 1992 (age 33); Osun State, Nigeria
- Origin: Kwara State, Nigeria
- Genres: Folk music; Afropop; hip hop
- Occupations: singer; songwriter; formulation scientist
- Instrument: Vocals
- Years active: 2020– present

Abdullah Adeoye Abubakre (born 9 December 1992) better known as Ayola is a Canadian based Nigerian folk singer, songwriter and performer, known for his single Sare Toban which gained recognition on TikTok in December 2022.

He also works as a formulation scientist and regulatory affairs specialist.

== Early life and education ==
Ayola was born in Osun State and raised in Kwara State, Nigeria.

He studied biochemistry at Ahmadu Bello University Zaria and his Master’s degree in pharmaceutics at University College London and his second master's degree in Medical Biotechnology at the University of Windsor, Windsor in Canada.

His research findings on "intravitreal delivery" at the University College London were one of the core principles that was used in the formation of the British research company, Optceutics Ltd.

== Career ==
In October 2020, he released his EP titled Scum in partnership with Windsor music label.

On 26 November 2021, he released his debut album titled Conversations Till Dawn which debuted at the Nigerian Spotify charts alongside Burna Boy, Asa and Simi

In 2022 he was listed among the top 10 most underrated Nigerian artistes in 2022 by National daily newspaper Thenation.

On 8 December 2022, Ayola’s hit single Sare Toban was among the top 10 most popular Nigerian songs on TikTok by Vanguard.

== Discography ==
=== Album ===
- Conversations Till Dawn

=== EP ===
- Scum

=== Single ===
- Bola
- Sare Tobon
- 1974
- Femi

== See also ==
- List of Nigerian musicians
- Nigerian Canadians
