= Port Harcourt Male Ensemble =

Nigerian choral group

- Also known as: PHME
- Origin: Port Harcourt, Rivers State, Nigeria
- Genres: choral, classical, jazz, gospel
- Occupation: Men's Chorus
- Years active: 2001—present
- Members: Artistic Director; Bob Amunye
- Past members: Iwefa Aganaba

The Port Harcourt Male Ensemble (PHME) is an all-male choral group based in Port Harcourt, the capital of Rivers State, Nigeria. It was founded in 1998 and inaugurated on 5 May 2001. PHME is dedicated to the promotion and advancement of African classical music. The artistic director is Bob Amunye.

In 2015, the group won the Commonwealth Community Choir Competition and was also awarded the National Award of Excellence for Most Outstanding Youth Organization in Nigeria.

== See also ==
- Music of Port Harcourt
- List of Nigerian musical groups
