= Strei (singer) =

- Born: Howard Efemena Dominic; Ughelli South, Delta State, Nigeria
- Origin: Warri, Delta State, Nigeria
- Genres: Afrobeats; Afromood
- Occupation: Singer
- Years active: 2024–present
- Label: KTIZO WRLD Records

Strei, born Howard Efemena Dominic, is a Nigerian singer and songwriter.

== Early life ==
Strei was born Howard Efemena Dominic in Ughelli South in Delta State, Nigeria, and grew up in Warri. He is signed to KTIZO WRLD Records, with international distribution through Platoon. He first sang in a church choir. In interviews he has said his early influences were American artists, including the rappers XXXTentacion and Juice Wrld and the musician Shiloh Dynasty, rather than Afrobeats, to which he has said he came later.

== Career ==
=== Early recordings and signing ===
Strei began recording covers on the mobile application BandLab using a phone, and posted clips of the covers to TikTok, where they gained a following. In 2024, after completing his WAEC examinations, he was approached by KTIZO WRLD Records and signed to the label later that year. He moved to Lagos in January 2025 to pursue music full-time. KTIZO WRLD later entered a distribution partnership with Platoon.

=== I.T.A.M. (2025) ===
Strei's first project, I.T.A.M. (Introduction to Afromood), was released in 2025. In an interview with The NATIVE, he described the project as a mixtape comprising re-recorded versions of covers he had previously released, together with one original song, and said it was intended as an introduction to his style. According to Wetalksound, the six tracks on the project each surpassed one million streams on Spotify within eight months of release. In December 2024, Strei performed at the ENCORE event alongside the singer Tay Iwar.

=== Singles and NIGHT (2026) ===
After I.T.A.M., Strei released the singles "Imagine" and "Blessing", and a collaboration with the singer Babyboy AV titled "Crazily". In April 2026, he released the single "Anxiety", which was recorded at KTIZO Studios with the producers Treasure and Big Space; in a statement to The Guardian, he said the song was based on his personal experience of anxiety.

His seven-track project NIGHT followed in 2026. Speaking to The NATIVE, Strei said the project was built around the theme of freedom, and that much of its material was written in late 2025 after he and his team rebuilt an earlier version of the record.

Speaking to Pulse Ghana about the Babyboy AV collaboration "Crazily", Strei said the song drew on his reflections on a past relationship.

In 2026, Strei released the single "Catapult", a collaboration with the artist Dxtiny, which The Nation described as the first release of his year and said had been recorded at KTIZO WRLD Studios with the producer BigSpace and the engineer Treasure. The same article reported that Strei had passed 20 million streams across platforms by the time of the release.

In June 2026, The Guardian (London) included Strei in its weekly "Add to Playlist" feature on new releases.

== Style ==
Strei records under the genre label "Afromood", a term he uses to describe his own combination of Afrobeats rhythms and what he has called emotionally driven songwriting. Speaking to The Guardian (Nigeria) about the single "Anxiety", he described his sound as "expressive, vulnerable, and emotional", and said his songs were typically built around freestyled melodies developed into lyrics in the studio. Writing for The NATIVE, Frederick Adjavon characterised Strei's approach as combining the lyrical influence of artists such as Shiloh Dynasty with an "intuitive command of African rhythms".

== Discography ==
=== Extended plays and mixtapes ===
- I.T.A.M. (Introduction to Afromood) (2025)
- NIGHT (2026)

=== Selected singles ===
- "Imagine" (2025)
- "Blessing" (2025)
- "Crazily" (with Babyboy AV) (2025)
- "Anxiety" (2026)
- "Catapult" (with Dxtiny) (2026)
