= Oluwa Toyo =

Nigerian singer

- Also known as: Oluwa Toyo
- Born: Balogun Toyosi Caleb; 16 March 1990 (age 36); Lagos State, Nigeria
- Genres: Afrobeats
- Occupations: Singer; songwriter
- Instrument: Keyboard
- Years active: 2023–present
- Label: Regler Records Ltd

Balogun Toyosi Caleb (born 16 March 1990), known professionally as Oluwa Toyo, is a Nigerian singer and songwriter. He gained recognition in 2024 after his collaboration 'Awe' featuring Hotkeed entered the Spotify Viral Top 50 chart. On 25 October 2024, he reached No. 13 on the TurnTable's NXT Emerging Top Artistes. His single “Saro” debuted at No. 22 on the TurnTable Top 50 single chart in August 2025 and went viral on TikTok.

== Early life and education ==
Balogun Toyosi Caleb was born on 16 March 1990 in Lagos, Nigeria. He attended Shyllon Primary School, where he began his primary education in 1998. He attended Ilupeju College, Ilupeju, in 2002 for his junior secondary schooling. He later continued his senior secondary education at Ikotun High School in 2005. He attended Adekunle Ajasin University, graduating in 2015. He is currently pursuing a master’s degree at the University of Lagos.

== Career ==
On 10 August 2024, Oluwa Toyo entered the Spotify Viral Top 50 chart with the collaboration 'Awe'. He later released an EP on 18 October 2024. On 25 October 2024, he reached No. 13 on the TurnTable's NXT Emerging Top Artistes. He was listed among the top trending emerging artists on Audiomack and was also named among the top 8 Afrobeats Artists to Watch in 2025 by Independent Nigeria. On 25 January 2025, he was listed among the top 10 Most Underrated Nigerian Artistes in 2024 by This Day. On 25 August 2025, Oluwa Toyo’s single 'Saro' debuted at No. 22 on the TurnTable Top 50 single chart. The song was also listed among Nigeria’s top viral TikTok songs of 2025. On 5 December 2025, he reached the Apple Music Nigeria Top 10 with the single 'Worry Dem'.

== Discography ==
=== EPs ===
- Omo Balo (2024)

=== Singles ===
- Awe. (featuring Hotkeed)(2024)
- Saro (2025)
- Authentic La Cruise (ALC)(2025)
- Jaburata (2025)
- Slow Down (2025)
- Worry Dem (2025)
- Talk About Me (2026)

== See also ==
- List of Nigerian musicians
