= Aralola Olamuyiwa =

Nigerian female entertainer

- Born: Aralola Olamuyiwa; 23 January 1975 (age 51); Lagos, Nigeria
- Instruments: Vocals; talking drum

Aralola Olamuyiwa (born January 23, 1975), commonly known by her stage name Ara, is a female singer, entertainer, talking drummer, and the cultural ambassador of the Ooni of Ife.

She is the foremost female drummer in Africa. Widely travelled, she has performed both locally and internationally to critical acclaim, sharing the stage with the legend Stevie Wonder, in one of her rapturous performances. In a career spanning four decades, Ara has lived up to her stage name.

She was born in Lagos State and hails from Ondo State.

== Education ==
She spent a good part of her childhood in Warri, Delta state, where she attended Nana Primary School, Our Ladies High School, and Folashaye Girls Grammar School. She then had a brief stay at University of Ilorin as a fresh law student, but left and later returned, this time to Ambrose Ali University Ekpoma, Edo State, where she studied English Language.

== Career ==
She was born into a music-loving family that also appreciated excellence. Her journey into musical excellence began at a tender age, and had written her first song before age 10.

According to her, she started playing drums at the young age of five.

She went from performing at family events and corporate events to becoming the head drummer and rshe epresented her school in many singing and choral competitions in which she won numerous awards. She admitted her love for music was influenced by her father. She also admitted to playing drums during her days in secondary school.

She came to the limelight in 2000 with her first video titled ‘Which one you dey,” recorded by Ebenezer studio between 1998 and 1999.

She has also performed for the Queen of England, Bill Clinton, Olusegun Obasanjo, Black Mayors Caucus in America, Evander Holyfield, Wesley Snipes and Broadway executives. She recently collaborated with 2face Idibia for the remake of Ebenezer Obey's classic “Olomi”. She is an awardee of the Nigeria Books Of Record

== Personal life ==
She married her ex-husband, Prince Nurudeen Olalekan Saliu, and has a son with him.
