= The Remedies =

Nigerian hip-hop group

- Origin: Lagos, Nigeria
- Genres: Naija hip hop
- Years active: 1997 – early 2000s
- Label: Kennis Music
- Past members: Eedris Abdulkareem (left 1999); Tony Tetuila; Eddie Remedy (aka Eddie Montana)

The Remedies was a pioneering Nigerian hiphop music group. It consisted of Eedris Abdulkareem, Tony Tetuila and Eddy Remedy (also known as Eddy Montana).
