= Joseph Omotoye =

Joseph Omotoye, also known as Jojo Bodybeats, is a Nigerian musician, principally known for his ability to use his own body as a percussive instrument. Striking his mouth, cheeks, chest, stomach, head and legs, as well as using belching, sneezing, coughing and drinking, he is able to produce sounds that are recognizably musical. He refers to his own body as a "bodiophone".
