= Twins Affair =

- Born: Taye Olusola; Kehinde Olusola; 14 April 1984 (age 42); Ilorin, Nigeria
- Origin: Odo-Eri, Kogi State, Nigeria
- Genres: R&B, hip hop, pop
- Years active: 1999–present
- Website: twinsgistmag.com

Twins Affair Twins Affair.oggis a music duo from Ilorin, Nigeria.

== Early life ==
Taye Damilola Olusola and Kehinde Rotimi Olusola, born on April 14th, 1984 are twin brothers who are well-known recording artists, music producers, and journalists. The duo, known as Twins Affair, is ranked as one of Nigeria's top hip-hop duet artists, ranked next to P-Square. They are also among the few top Nigerian artists that produce their own songs. In addition to their music careers, the Twins Affair operates an online Entertainment news website TWINS GIST ONLINE MAGAZINE.

Taye Damilola Olusola and Kehinde Rotimi Olusola, (Twins Affair) are siblings and have been inseparable since birth. They have always been classmates in all the schools they attended. They started their education at Family Support Primary School, Kabba, Kogi State from 1993 to 1998. Later, they went to St Barnabas Secondary School, Kabba, Kogi State from 1998 to 2004. They both pursued their Bachelor's degree in Music at Delta State University, Abraka, Nigeria from 2005 to 2010. From 2013 to 2014, they also completed their Post Graduate Diploma in Journalism at the International Institute of Journalism, Abuja, Nigeria. Additionally, they did a three-month music production course in 2011 at Life Line Studio, Allen Avenue, Lagos under the guidance of T.Y Snoop, a renowned music producer who has worked with Mr. Olu Maintain.

== Musical career ==
The Twins Affair's involvement in music is at the instance of their multi-instrumentalist father, Mr. Olusola Ogungbemi, who taught them how to play the keyboard, guitar, drum set and saxophone at the age of four. At the age of 9, Taye and Kehinde were the keyboardists and bass guitarists, respectively, of the Living Faith Church Worldwide, Kabba, Kogi State, Nigeria.

In 1999, Twins Affair recorded their first album which was tagged "Egunje has sploit everything". The album was produced by music Producer/Musicologist, Austin Emielu, senior lecturer at the University of Ilorin, Nigeria, and it became an instant hit. The success of the maiden album spurred the Twins Affair to go to the studio a year later in 2000 to record another album tagged "Why fighting, why killing" in response to the religious conflicts in the then Northern Nigeria. The two albums released by the Twins Affair did not accord the group national recognition as its popularity was only confined to about six states in the North out of the 36 states in Nigeria. The frustration of the inability of the group to penetrate Lagos, which is the nerve center of music/entertainment in Nigeria, compelled them to go on a sabbatical.

In their second year at the university in 2008, the music duo known as Twins Affair released an album titled 'AREA'. Unfortunately, the album did not perform well in the market due to poor publicity and the marketer's lackadaisical attitude. A few months later, they released an audio and video single titled 'SKELEBE' which was aired on local and international television stations. Despite the video being aired on various TV stations, Twins Affair still did not receive the recognition it deserved in the Nigerian music industry.

In 2010, the Twins Affair released an audio and video single tagged 'ASA'. The single became an instant hit. This was followed by another hit single and video in 2011 tagged 'O bad gan'. With these two singles, the Twins Affair became a household name in the Nigerian music scene. The Twins Affair has also featured and produced many top Nigerian artists such as LKT, Yung6ix, Slay, Aq, Maytronomy, Nene Johnson, Ms. Chief, Nenjazi a Nigerian American-based artiste just to mention a few.

Twins Affair is a Nigerian music duo that is widely respected for their skills as music producers and recording artists. They were previously employed as music lecturers and studio music producers at the prestigious PEFTI Film Institute Lagos, which is owned by Wale Adenuga Production (Super Story), a renowned figure in the Nigerian entertainment industry. They worked there from 2012 until 2013, after which they resigned to pursue a one-year Post-Graduate Diploma in Journalism at the International Institute of Journalism in Abuja. Some of their recent works, such as "BEAUTIFUL" featuring M kel, "GO THERE," and "MELODY" featuring MS. Chief and Nenjazi, have received critical acclaim and further cemented their position as a dominant force in the Nigerian music industry.

=== Awards ===
- Real Sound Entertainment in conjunction with Radio Kogi, Lokoja Kogi State BEST CREW ARTISTES OF THE YEAR AWARD.
