= The Headies Award for Best Vocal Performance (Male) =

Nigerian music industry award

- Awarded for: Individual Male Artiste with the most outstanding vocal performance on a single song or album
- Country: Nigeria
- Presented by: Hip Hop World Magazine
- First award: 2006
- Final award: 2019
- Website: theheadies.com

The Headies Award for Best Vocal Performance (Male) is an award presented at The Headies, a ceremony that was established in 2006 and originally called the Hip Hop World Awards. (Note: The nominees for the 2006 edition are not included in the Recipients table because they are not available.) First presented to Faze in 2006, the category is one of six categories not open to public voting.

== Recipients ==
Best Vocal Performance (Male)
Year	Nominees	Result
2020	Praiz – "Under the Sky"	Won
2020	Wurld – "Ghost Town"	Nominated
2020	Chike – "Forgive"	Nominated
2020	Cobhams – "We plenti"	Nominated
2020	Nonso Amadi – "What makes you sure"	Nominated
2020	Johnny Drille – "Count on you"	Nominated
2019	Wurld – "Wishes and Butterflies"	Won
2019	Nonso Bassey – "411"	Nominated
2019	Johnny Drille – "Finding Efe"	Nominated
2019	Funbi – "Serenade"	Nominated
2019	Tay Iwar – "Utero"	Nominated
2018	Praiz – "Folashade"	Won
2018	Faze – "Perfect Woman"	Nominated
2018	Johnny Drille – "Romeo & Juliet"	Nominated
2018	Nonso Amadi – "Tonight"	Nominated
2018	Banky W. – "Love You Baby"	Nominated
2016	Shaydee – "Smile"	Won
2016	Brymo – "Something Good is Happening"	Nominated
2016	Darey – "Pray for Me" (featuring Soweto Gospel Choir)	Nominated
2016	Wande Coal – "Super Woman"	Nominated
2016	Ric Hassani – "Gentleman"	Nominated
2015	Timi Dakolo – "Wish Me Well"	Won
2015	Bez – "There's a Fire"	Nominated
2015	Cobhams Asuquo – "Do The Right Thing"	Nominated
2015	Shaydee – "High"	Nominated
2015	Praiz – "If I Fall"	Nominated
2014	Timi Dakolo – "Iyawo Mi"	Won
2014	Oritse Femi – "Double Wahala"	Nominated
2014	Nosa – "Why You Love Me"	Nominated
2014	Cobhams Asuquo – "Ordinary People"	Nominated
2013	Praiz – "Rich & Famous"	Won
2013	Ese Peters – "Omote"	Nominated
2013	Capital F.E.M.I – "Don’t Let Go"	Nominated
2013	Banky W. – "Yes/No"	Nominated
2012	Wande Coal – "Private Trips"	Won
2012	Banky W. – "Low Key"	Nominated
2012	Praiz – "I Love You"	Nominated
2012	Brymo – "Ara"	Nominated
2012	Bez – "Stupid Song"	Nominated
2011	Capital Femi - "Money Money Money"	Won
2011	Darey – "The Way You Are"	Nominated
2011	Bez – "More You"	Nominated
2011	Timi Dakolo – "There Is A Cry"	Nominated
2010	Darey – "No Stars"	Won
2010	Banky W. – "Strong Ting"	Nominated
2010	Wande Coal – "Banana"	Nominated
2010	GT the Guitarman – "Kinimatise"	Nominated
2010	Timi Dakolo – "Heaven Please"	Nominated
2009	Banky W. – "Don't Break My Heart"	Won
2009	Darey – "Not the Girl"	Nominated
2009	Etcetera – "Michelle"	Nominated
2009	Wande Coal – "Taboo"	Nominated
2008	9ice - "Ruggedy Baba"	Won
2008	2face Idibia – "Stylee"	Nominated
2008	Wande Coal – "Ololufe"	Nominated
2008	Faze – "Someone like You"	Nominated
2007	Obiwon - "Onyinye"	Won
2007	Paul Play – "Forever" and "Angel of My Life"	Nominated
2007	Silver – "Lala"	Nominated
2007	OJB Jezreel – "Searching"	Nominated
2007	Soul E – "Soul E Baba"	Nominated
2006	Faze – "Faze Alone"	Won

== Category records ==
Most wins

Rank	1st	2nd
Artist	Timi Dakolo; Praiz	Banky W. Faze; Darey; Wande Coal; 9ice Obiwon; Capital Femi; Shaydee; Wurld
Total wins	2 Wins	1 win

Most nominations

Rank	1st	2nd	3rd	4th
Artist	Wande Coal; Banky W.	Darey; Timi Dakolo; Praiz	Bez; Faze	Cobhams Asuquo; Capital Femi; Brymo; Shaydee; Johnny Drille
Total noms	5 nominations	4 nominations	3 nominations	2 nominations
