= Paul Play Dairo =

Nigerian R&B singer, songwriter, and music producer

Paul "Play" Dairo is a Nigerian R&B singer, songwriter, and music producer, best known for hit singles such as Angel of My Life, Forever, and You and Me. He is the son of the late I. K. Dairo, a Juju music legend who was the first African musician to receive an MBE from Queen Elizabeth II.

== Early life ==
Paul Play Dairo was born in Nigeria to Chief I.K. Dairo and grew up surrounded by music. He initially studied Mechanical Engineering and briefly worked with Shell Petroleum before pursuing a full-time music career.

== Music career ==
=== 1999–2002: Breakthrough with Kennis Music ===
Dairo rose to prominence after releasing a remix of his father's classic Mo So Rire, which caught the attention of Kennis Music. Under the label, he released Dairo Music Foundation Project 1 (1999) and Project 2 (2002), which produced the hit Forever.

=== 2004–2007: Independent success ===
After leaving Kennis Music, he founded Playground Entertainment and released No.1 (2004) and Hitaville (2005), followed by Hero (2010). His single Angel of My Life became a staple Nigerian R&B classic.

=== 2014–present: Comeback and collaborations ===
Following a health challenge that forced a break from music, Dairo returned with singles such as Renegade (2014), Best Thing (2014), Fool in Love (2016), Tell It to Me (2016), Kolo (2020), and a remake of Angel of My Life (2020).

== Awards and recognition ==
Dairo has won multiple Headies Awards, including Best R&B Album, Artist of the Year, and Recording of the Year. He has also received FAME Awards, AMEN Awards, and recognition from M-Net South Africa.

== Personal life ==
In interviews, Dairo has spoken about health challenges that nearly ended his career and his determination to continue making music. He has also publicly discussed royalty disputes with his former label, Kennis Music.

== Discography ==
=== Studio albums ===
- Dairo Music Foundation Project 1 (1999)
- Project 2 (2002)
- No.1 (2004)
- Hitaville (2005)
- Hero (2010)

=== Selected singles ===
- Forever (2002)
- Angel of My Life (2004)
- Renegade (2014)
- Best Thing (2014)
- Fool in Love (2016)
- Tell It to Me (2016)
- Kolo (2020)
- Angel of My Life (Remake) (2020)
- Guidance (2020)
