= Kheengz =

Nigerian rapper and actor (born 1992)

- Also known as: YFK
- Born: King Bawa; 8 July 1992 (age 34); Zaria, Kaduna State, Nigeria
- Origin: Bida, Niger State, Nigeria
- Genre: Hip hop
- Occupations: Rapper; singer; actor
- Years active: 2010–present
- Label: YFK Entertainment

King Bawa (born 8 July 1992), better known by his stage name as Kheengz, is a Nigerian rapper and actor, born in the Northern part of Nigeria. He currently works under his own independent record label called YFK Entertainment. His debut album Voice of Arewa was released 25 December 2019 was a huge success up north. His single I Am North made waves in the music scene as it is about stereotyping arewa.

== Early life ==
Kheengz was born in Zaria, Kaduna and was raised in Bida, Niger. He is of Kadara ethnicity and the third of six children. He earned a bachelor's degree in Civil Engineering from Ahmadu Bello University, Zaria.

== Career ==
Kheengz began writing rap songs while in secondary school in 2006. He started recording in 2010 at university. He released a cover of Sarkodie's hit song You Go Kill Me (Azonto) and later freestyled Ice Prince's hit song Aboki, which got him the attention from M.I Abaga.

=== 2013–2014: College Kid mixtape ===
On 30 August 2013, Kheengz released his first project College Kid Mixtape which features rap artistes M.I Abaga, Erigga, Snowflake, Soul Flavour and G'rell. The lead single on the popular mixtape is "Jealousy". He later released a video titled I believe that was dedicated to the students killed in College of Agriculture, Yobe State.

=== 2015–2017: VOA (Voice of Arewa) EP and Pedestal EP ===
His sophomore project was EP VOA (voice of arewa), which he released 21 November 2015. He went on to release the Pedestal EP on 21 December 2017. He later released a song with a movement "I Am North" to address the popular stereotypical views of Northerners in Nigeria.

=== 2019–2021: Voice of Arewa Album and The Four Horsemen EP ===
Kheengz debut album Voice of Arewa (also tagged Voice of the North) was released on 25 December 2019. The album has features from Erigga, DJ AB, DJ Steev and Ijaya. He also featured Ice Prince in the remix of "Alhamdulillah" which was released in 2019. On 26 December 2020, Kheengz teamed up with other northern rappers DJ AB, Deezell and BOC Madaki on a joint EP The Four Horsemen, containing four tracks.

On 4 June 2021, Kheengz released a single Who be This Guy featuring Falz and M.I Abaga. Since the announcement of the music collaboration in July 2020, media space has been creating many buzz on the collaboration before it was released. The video was released on 2 July 2021, directed by Bash'em.

Kheengz explored another aspect of his creativity by starring in Nigerian television series Crazy, Lovely, Cool on Netflix.

== Discography ==
=== Studio album ===
- Voice of Arewa - VOA (2019)

=== EPs ===
- Voice of Arewa the EP (2015)
- Pedestal EP (2017)
- The Four Horsemen EP (2020)

=== Mixtapes ===
- College Kid Mixtape (2013)

== Filmography ==
=== Film and television ===
Television
Year	Title	Role	Notes	Ref
2018	Crazy, Lovely, Cool	Hassan	Supporting role	
2019	Heart & Soul	Bad Boy	Supporting role	
2024	Don (by Deezell TV	Doctor	Supporting role	

|}
