= Ifé (musician) =

Nigerian singer

- Born: Ifechukwu Mercy Michael; 29 November 1997 (age 28); Awka, Anambra State, Nigeria
- Origin: Anambra State, Nigeria
- Genres: Afro-Soul; pop; Afrobeats; alté
- Occupations: Singer-songwriter; performer
- Instruments: Vocals; piano; Guitar; keyboard; African percussion
- Years active: 2018–present

Ifechukwu Mercy Michael (born 29 November 1997) professionally known as Ifé is a Nigerian singer-songwriter and performer. She is known for the Afro-Soul, Afrobeats and alte genres. She released her first single 'Nwa' in 2018 and gained prominence after the release of "Ozo" featuring Ụmụ Obiligbo in 2019 .

== Biography ==
A native of Umuawulu, Anambra State, Ifé was born on 29 November 1997 in Awka, Anambra State. She is the last child of her parents, Mr. Chinyere Wilfred Michael and Mrs. Oluchi Mavis Michael and has five other siblings. Ifé was born into a musical family and her parents recorded about three albums. At the age of ten, she was already passionate about igbo traditional music. She acquired her primary and secondary education in Anambra State. Later, she proceeded to Nnamdi Azikiwe University in Awka, Nigeria where she studied and graduated with a bachelor's degree in Music and Performing Arts.

== Music career ==
On 3 October 2018, Ifé released her first single "Nwa". That same year, she followed with two other singles "Egwu" and "Nwa Remix". In November 2019, she debuted her first EP "DarkLight". Prior to the release of the DarkLight EP, she released three singles "Nwayo", "Ifunanya" and "Ozo".

Ifé released her first album in 2021 "Sunset and Paragraphs", which earned her recognition. The album comprised 13 tracks including "Ife Melu", a tribute song to those that lost their lives during the Biafran war. A year before the album release, she performed at the Mondial Music for Women Festival in Abidjan, and later the Black History Concert 2021 in Lagos, Nigeria. A year later in November 2022, she released another single "Paradise (All Over Me)".

In 2023, she was featured on Gen Uru's "Worthy Album" including tracks like "Oshimiri" with Rudeboy and "Uru Dia" with Acetune, Ifex G.

In 2025, Ifé began reinventing Nigerian classics and old-school songs, performing them in acoustic versions. In an interview, she stated that she was answering the call of her ancestors.

== Discography ==
=== Albums ===
List of albums, with selected details
Title	Album details
DarkLight	Released: November 8, 2019; Format: Digital download
Sunset and Paragraphs	Released: November 19, 2021; Format: Digital download

=== Singles ===
Year	Title
2018	Nwa
2018	Egwu
2018	Nwa Remix
2019	Nwayo
2019	Ifunanya with Ahec 3
2019	Ozo with Umu Obiligbo
2020	Ulaga
2020	Nwanyi
2021	Zelu
2022	Paradise (All Over Me)
2024	No Turning Back with Kolaboy
2024	Mmadu Aburo Chukwu ft Dandizzy, Acetune, Sparkle Tee
2024	I do for you with Ejyk Nwamba
2024	Ikemefuna
2024	Imachakwa with Zoro
2025	Ifechukwudelu Feat. ILLBliss
2025	Ogiriga
