= Staqk G =

Nigerian rapper (born 1996)

- Born: Jude Brown Tamunoibim; 31 July 1996 (age 30); Ibadan
- Other name: Tony Brown
- Occupations: Rapper; singer; songwriter; entrepreneur
- Years active: 2017–present
- Musical career
- Genres: Hip hop; Afrobeats
- Website: www.staqkmoneyschool.com

Tamunoibim Jude Tonye-Brown (born 31 July 1996), better known as Staqk G, is a Nigerian rapper, singer, songwriter, and entrepreneur, who came into the limelight shortly after the fourth season of Hennessy Cypher's session titled "Gidi Gang". He had a minor break with the release of "Mama Look" featuring Kayode, which debuted on TurnTable Top Triller Chart at 25, and a domestic success with "Way", which gained popularity on TikTok. He currently serves as a digital marketing expert, CEO, and Founder of Staqk Money School.

== Early life and career ==
Jude Brown Tamunoibim is from one of the communities in the 23 local government areas in Rivers, a State in the Southern region of Nigeria. He was born on 31 July 1996 in Ibadan, and had his secondary education at Basorun Ogunmola High School.

In 2017, Staqk was introduced by Hennessy as one of its participants in the fourth season of its Cypher's session, alongside Falz, Dremo, Ladipoe, and Yoye. In 2020, he had a minor break with his debut single "Mama Look", which debuted on TurnTable Top Triller Chart at 25. He rose to prominence in 2022, with his debut single "Way", which gained popularity from TikTok. Staqk started a YouTube channel titled Staqk Money on 27 January 2023, where he shares e-commerce tips and documents his experiences.

In 2023, Staqk founded Staqk Money School, an e-commerce teaching institute. On 12 October 2023, at a press conference held by Staqk Money School, he unveiled his plans for the second quarter of 2024. He also highlighted the impact of the e-commerce industry in Nigeria, and how the COVID-19 pandemic had contributed to its growth in creating e-commerce businesses.

== Artistry ==
He credited 2pac, 50 Cent, Biggie, Kanye West, J. Cole, Jay-Z and Vector as his biggest musical influences.
