= St. Seii =

Nigerian Singer-songwriter and record producer

- Born: Jalal St. Toby Iyonagbe
- Occupation: Singer • Songwriter • Record Producer
- Musical career
- Instrument: Vocals
- Years active: 2021–present

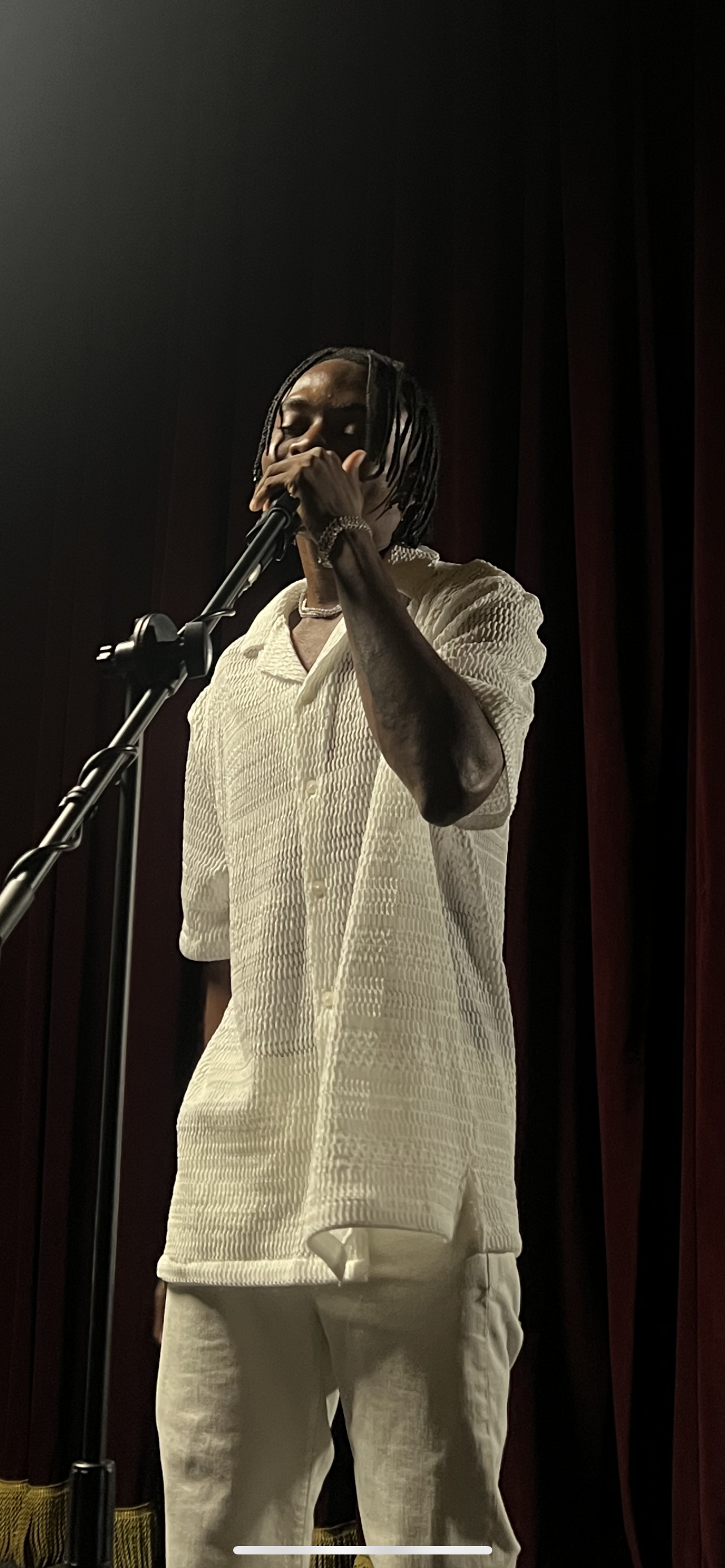
St. Seii at cherie coco performance

Jalal St. Toby Iyonagbe, known professionally as St. Seii, is a Nigerian singer-songwriter and rapper. He is best known for his extended play Bittersweet, which debuted on Nigeria Spotify Top Albums chart alongside Burna Boy, Asa, Simi according to Vanguard Nigeria. It also ranked among the top 10 most trending albums on Audiomack all genres. He is also known for his single "Jefa" which earned him his first chart entry on Nigeria TurnTable Top 50 single chart and was ranked number 9 on TurnTable's NXT Emerging Top Artistes, "Jefa" also debuted on the Spotify Viral Top 50.

== Early life ==
Iyonagbe was born in Lagos where he grew and hails from Edo State, Nigeria.

== Career ==
On 27 August 2022, he released a single titled "Eterima". In 2022, his EP Bittersweet debuted on Nigeria Spotify Top Albums chart alongside Burna Boy, Asa, and Simi according to Vanguard Nigeria. Later in 2022, the EP entered the top 10 most trending albums on Audiomack all genres. In November 2022 he performed at the All Africa festival in Dubai. In December 2022, he released a capsule consisting of two singles titled "La Saint". On 27 January 2023, he was listed by P.M. News as a musician to watch alongside 1ucid, Snazzy the Optimist, Logos Olori, Raebel, and others. In March 2023, he released a music video for his single "FITNA" marking his directorial debut. On 3 May 2025, he headlined his first-ever concert titled "St. Seii Live in Concert" at Oak Live Bar in the United Arab Emirates.

== Discography ==
=== EPs ===
- Bittersweet
- Nirvana

=== Singles ===
- "Eterima"
- "Cherrie Coco"
- "Bundus"
- "Woodtalk"
- "FITNA"
