= Babyboy AV =

Nigerian singer (b. 1999)

- Also known as: AV
- Born: Adindu Victor; 14 March 1999 (age 27); Benin City, Edo, Nigeria
- Genres: Afrobeats; World music; Afro-fusion
- Occupations: Singer; songwriter
- Years active: 2019–present
- Labels: WM Sweden; Longitude Promotion
- Website: babyboyav.net

YouTube information
- Channel: Babyboy AV
- Subscribers: 185 Thousand
- Views: 106 Million
- Last updated: 4 August 2026

Adindu Victor (born 14 March 1999), known professionally as Babyboy AV, formerly known as AV, is a Nigerian singer and songwriter. He gained recognition for his 2021 single "Big Thug Boys", which peaked at number five on Billboard Triller Chart.

== Early life ==
Adindu Victor was born in Benin City, Edo State, to an Igbo father from Delta State and Edo mother. He was raised in the city in a mixed environment. He had his tertiary education at Ambrose Alli University, where he obtained his first degree.

== Career ==
Baby Boy AV was motivated by his musician father, a guitarist who became passionate about music at an early age. He made his professional start in the music business in 2018 and debuted in 2020 with the song "Temperature," which was widely played on radio and television. In 2019, he performed at the well-known Felabration, among other occasions. In an episode of the All-Nighter podcast, he revealed that he once found himself squatting in the residence of Victor AD before releasing "Big Thug Boys".

With the release of his official debut song, "Big Thug Boys," accompanied by a music video produced and directed by director Dindu, Baby Boy AV gained notoriety. Afrobeat and Dancehall are combined in Baby Boy AV's sound, which has amassed over 10 million YouTube views

Following his breakout in 2021, Babyboy AV headlined Afro Beach Festival in Accra, Ghana alongside Costa Titch, and Kofi Kinaata in December 2022.

By June 2023, he released his first single of the year, "Quick Question" after his EP project rollout.

== Discography ==
=== EP ===
Year	EP Title	Tracks	Producers
2022	Thug Love (EP)	1. Unbeatable; 2. Thug Love; 3. B&B (Booze & Bumbum); 4. No Dey Form; 5. Wake Up	1. Black Culture; 2. Kulboy; 3. KTIZO; 4. Black Culture; 5. Black Culture

=== Singles ===
Year	Song title	Producer	Album
2020	Temperature	Vybe	
2020	My Song		
2020	Hustle		
2021	Big Boy Thugs	Kulboy	
2021	Confession	Tempo	
2022	Jiggy	Krizbeatz	
2022	Big Thug Boys (Dj Yo! Remix)	Dj Yo!; Kulboy	
2022	Big Thug Boys (Remix) ft. Jireel	Kulboy	
2022	No Dey Form	Black Culture	Thug Love
2022	Big Boy Thugs (Remix) ft. Lama Shreif	Kulboy	
2022	Confession (Remix) ft. Black Culture		
2023	Quick Question	Black Culture	
2023	Jeje - A COLORS SHOW	Onijaife Oghenetaga Paul	
2023	Quick Question - Speedup Version	Black Culture	

=== Featured In ===
Year	Title	Producer	Album
2022	"F.D.P (Fire Di Party)" (featuring Dj Tunez)	Kulboy; Dj Tunez	
2022	"Home Boy" (featuring Joshua Adere)		
2022	"Veronica" (featuring Alpha P)	Blaisebeatz	
2022	"Roma" (featuring Kelvyn Boy)	KullBoiBeatz	
2023	"Jaga Jaga" (featuring Victony)	KTIZO	

== Awards and nominations ==
Year	Event	Category	Nomination	Result	Ref
2022	The Headies	Rookie of the Year	"Self"	Nominated	

== See also ==
- Naomi, Overo (9 July 2022). "AV IS THE NEWEST ADDITION ON THE ROSTER FOR SONY MUSIC PUBLISHING". www.culturecustodian.com.
