= Jaywon =

Nigerian musician

Background information
- Also known as: Oba Orin
- Born: Oluwajuwonlo Iledare; 6 June 1986 (age 40); Egbe, Kogi State, Nigeria
- Genre: Afropop
- Occupations: Singer, songwriter, performer
- Years active: 2005–present
- Label: Next World Music

Oluwajuwonlo Iledare (born 6 June 1986), professionally known as Jaywon, is a Nigerian singer, songwriter, performer, producer and actor. Following his departure from Kennis Music, he founded the Next World Music record label in 2013. In 2009, the Nigerian Music Video Awards presented Jaywon with the Best New Artist award. He also won the award for Best Recording at The Headies 2013 and the Tush Awards for the song "This Year".

== Life and career ==
Jaywon attended ECWA Primary School, then Government Secondary School in Kogi State, before graduating with an HND in Accounting from Federal Polytechnic, Bida.

He moved to Lagos in 2005. In less than a year, he secured collaborations with Ray G, Sound Sultan, W4, Slizzy E and 2Baba.

Jaywon was given the opportunity to sing at the Kennis Music Easter Fiesta in 2009, and he made such an impression that the event's organizers were immediately interested in him. He signed a record deal with Kennis Music Record Label later that year. In December 2012, he released the single "Odun Yi (This Year)" to critical and commercial acclaim. PZ Cusson later inked an endorsement arrangement with him, allowing the company to use "This Year" for promotional purposes.

=== Next World Music and Oba Orin ===
After going indie, Jaywon released his third album titled Oba Orin after four singles featuring Vector, Reminisce and Reekado Banks. It was the follow-up to the two albums he released on Kennis Music.

Reviewing the album for 360nobs, a critic characterized Oba Orin as a diverse collection of sounds that highlights Jaywon's musical style, describing the production as engaging while noting that the project's long-term impact would depend on its reception.

PulseNG rated it 3/5 and wrote:

'By the end of the album, you get a feeling that Jaywon has poured out his soul, connecting his influences and having his very creative essence flowing through you. It's like Jaywon performed personally for you, in a crowded local venue.'

Oba Orin, which means 'King of Songs' in Yoruba language, is a 21-track album with production from Mr Ejor, Benjossy, Blaq Jerzey and Young Jonn.

Jaywon gave first two weeks' return of Oba Orin to an orphanage.

Heattended the 2016 ACIA Awards in Atlanta, United States, and won the "Best Indigenous Act" award.

Jaywon premiered the remix for "Madantin" in 2014 featuring Phyno, Olamide and May D under the Next World Music imprint. He followed this with "Tanawole" featuring Reminisce. He also worked with rapper Vector tha Viper on "Back to Sender."

=== 2016–present: Aje (The Mixtape) ===
On June 25, 2020 Jaywon droped his ten-track album titled Aje (The Mixtape). It features vocals from Next World Music's new signee, Save Fame, as well as Zlatan, Lyta, Barry Jhay, Phyno, Magnito, IDYL, Danny S, Qdot, Keke Ogungbe, DMC Ladida, Alijiita, and Umu Obiligbo. It has production credits from irockclassic, Blaq Jerzee, Soularge, Don Adah, Tefa, Phynest, and Xsmile.

== Discography ==
=== Albums/EPs ===
- Meet Jaywon - 2009
- Meet Jaywon Reloaded - 2011
- This Year (Odun Yi) - 2013
- Oba Orin - 2016
- Aje the Mixtape (EP) - 2020
- Jahbahlee - 2022
- Evergreen - 2024

=== Singles ===
Title	Year	Release date
"Mandantin (Remix)" (featuring Phyno, Olamide and May D)	2014	21 February 2014
"Tanawole" (with Reminisce)	2014	1 May 2014
"Kule Lori"	2014	27 May 2014
"Back to Sender" (with Vector the Viper)	2014	8 August 2014
"You & Me" (with YQ)	2014	20 September 2014
"Fire for Fire"	2014	31 October 2014
"Okun United"	2015	13 February 2015
"Gbawo"	2015	9 July 2015
"Another Xmas"	2015	21 December 2015
"Jolly Muke"	2015	29 March 2016
"Champion"	2016	22 April 2016
"Paraga"	2016	18 May 2016
"Gbadun"	2016	14 July 2016
"Another Level" ft Mr Eazi	2016	6 November 2016
"Another Christmas is Here"	7 December 2016	
"Aje (remix part 1)" ft. Barry Jhay, Lyta	2019	Jun 05 2019
"Las Last" (featuring Seyi Vibez)	2021	September 9, 2021
"Sugar" (featuring Jaywillz)	2022	January 21, 2022
"Come Back" (featuring Costi_Ioniță)	2025	January 9, 2025
"Owo Ni Keke"	2026	February 1, 2026
"Jungle Boy"	2026	October 15, 2026

== Awards and nominations ==
Year	Event	Prize	Recipient	Result	Ref(s)
2009	Nigeria Entertainment Awards	Best New Act	"Himself"	Won	
2016	ACIA	Best Indigenous	"Himself"	Won	
2016	Tush Awards	Special Recognition	"Himself"	Won	
