= DJ AB =

Nigerian rapper and music producer (born 1993)

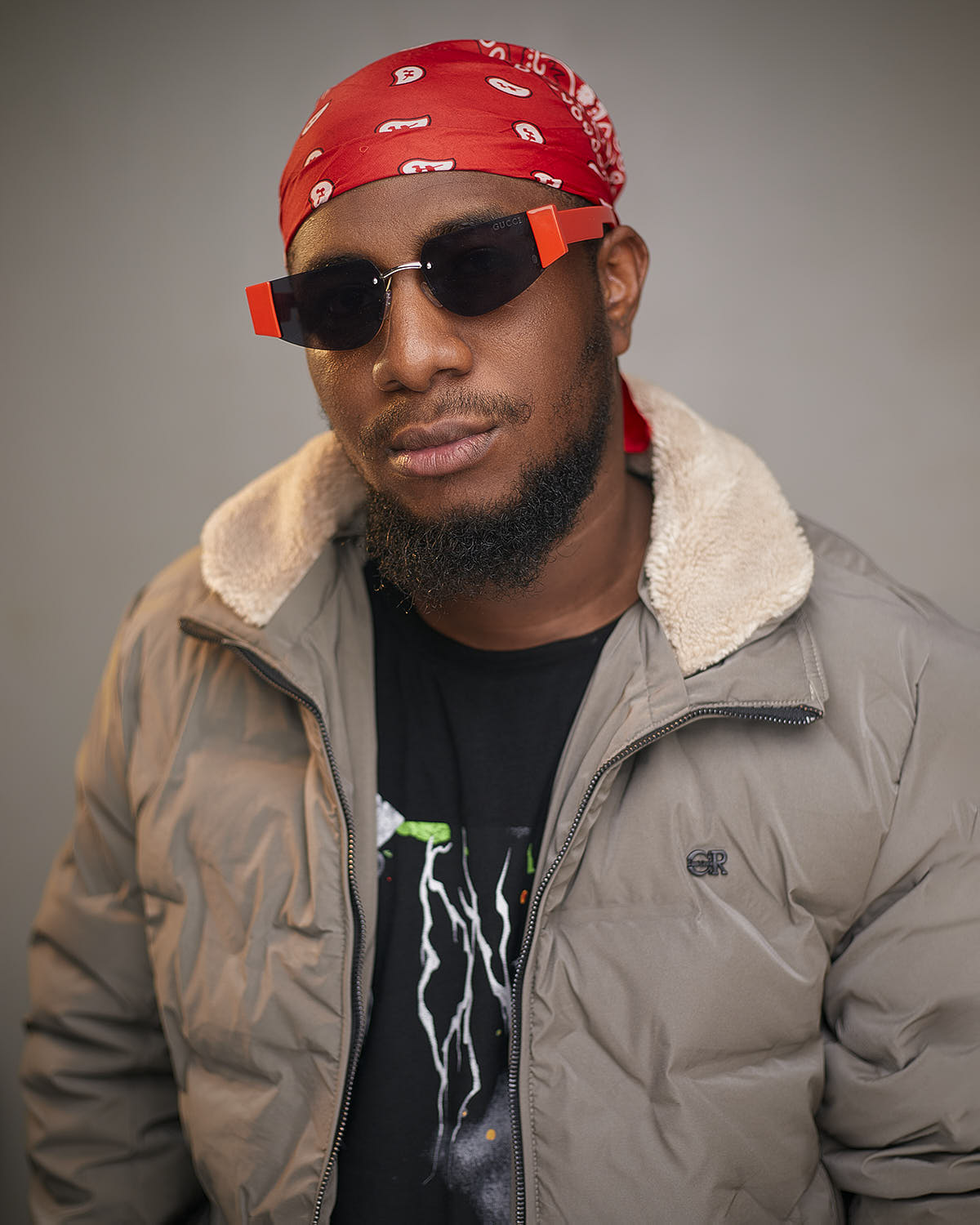
- Abdullahi in 2021

Background information
- Born: Haruna Abdullahi; December 30, 1993 (age 32); Kaduna, Nigeria
- Genres: Hip hop; Afrobeat; pop
- Occupations: Rapper; singer; songwriter; record producer
- Years active: 2010–present
- Website: djabmusic.com

Haruna Abdullahi (born 30 December 1993), known professionally as DJ AB, is a Nigerian rapper, singer, songwriter and record producer.

== Early life ==
DJ AB was born in Kaduna State, Nigeria where he obtained his JSCE and SSCE from Federal Government College, Kaduna State, he has completed his Bachelor's Degree in Quantity Survey at Ahmadu Bello University, Zaria Nigeria in 2024.

In 2020, DJ AB released a song titled "Da so samu ne" which earned him artistic recognition in Nigeria.

He is a brand ambassador of Coca-Cola and has provided a series of advertisements for the global multi-billion dollar brand.

In 2021, DJ AB partnered with emPawa Africa, a talent incubator program that supports artists all over Africa.

== Discography ==
- Studio Songs

Year	Song	Ref
2019	1. Ga ni 2. Yi Rawa (feat. Yung6ix); 3. Kumatu; 4. ‘Yar Boko; 5. Babarsa; 6. Totally; 7. Gan Gan; 8. Babban Yaya; 9. My Woman; 10. Soyayya; 11. Su baaba ne 12. Tell Me (feat. Sals Fateetee); 13. A Zuba shi 14. An zo wajen 15. Bomba man 16. Da ban ne	
2020	1. Da so samu ne	

- Studio EP (Extended Playlist)

Year	EP	Ref
2021	SUPA EP (feat. Mr Eazi & Di'Ja)	
2023	YOUR FAV ALBUM (feat Drinking Master, Boyskiddo, Namenj, Ice Prince zamani, Captain Jamyl, Zayn Africa, Feezy & BOC Madaki)	
2026	Big Energy	

== Awards and nominations ==
Year	Event	Prize	Recipient	Result	Ref
2017	City People Movie Award	Best Kannywood Hip-Hop Artist of the Year	Himself	Nominated	
2018	City People Music Award	Arewa Best Rap Artiste of the Year	Himself	Nominated	
2018	City People Music Award	Arewa Artiste of the Year (Male)	Himself	Nominated	
2020	City People Music Award	Arewa Best Rap Album of the Year	Himself	Nominated	
