= Tony Tetuila =

Nigerian rapper

- Born: Anthony Olanrewaju Awotoye; August 25, 1974 (age 52)
- Origin: Oro, Kwara, Nigeria
- Genre: Afrobeats
- Occupations: singer, songwriter, real estate entrepreneur, actor
- Years active: 1998–present

Anthony Olanrewaju Awotoye (born 25 August 1974), known professionally as Tony Tetuila, is a Nigerian singer and songwriter. He was a member of the defunct hip-hop group The Remedies, alongside Eedris Abdulkareem and Eddy Montana. Tetuila left the group and achieved commercial success as a solo artist. He is best known for the songs "My Car" and "Omode Meta".

== Early life ==
He was born on 25 August 1974 and is a native of Oro, Kwara State.

== Politics ==
In 2014, Tetuila ran for a seat in the Kwara State House of Assembly as a candidate of the All Progressives Congress. He later alleged that he was denied the position.

== Controversy ==
In December 2019, Tetuila filed a ₦30 million lawsuit against Wizkid, alleging copyright infringement over the song "Fefe N'efe" which featured Ghanaian singer Tic Tac.

== Discography ==
Album Information
My Car
E Go Better
