= Oritse Femi =

Nigerian singer-songwriter (born 1985)

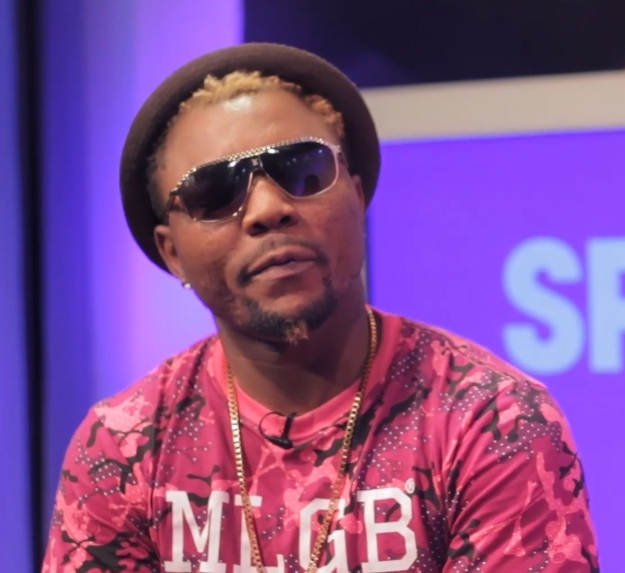

Background information
- Born: Oritsefemi Majemite Ekele; 5 January 1985 (age 41); Ajegunle, Lagos State
- Occupations: Singer-songwriter, recording artist, performer
- Years active: (solo career: 2006 – present)
- Label: Money Stop Nonsense (MSN) Gang
- Website: oritsefemi.com

Oritsefemi Majemite Ekele (born 5 January 1985) popularly known by his first name Oritse Femi, is a Nigerian singer-songwriter and performer. He is best known for his remake of Fela Kuti's "Double Wahala" song. His rendition of the song earned him two nominations at the 2014 City People Entertainment Awards, winning the award for Most Popular Song of the Year. He also won the Indigenous Artist of the Year award at the 2014 Nigeria Entertainment Awards. In 2014, he released the remix for his version of the song featuring D'banj.

== Personal life ==
Oritsefemi, the third child of his mother, was born and raised in a polygamous family of 25 in Ajegunle. He hails from the Itsekiri tribe of North Warri, Delta State. He briefly attended Mayday Secondary School in Ikoyi and switched to Tolu Primary School in Ajegunle due to his parents not being able to maintain the high cost of schooling in the affluent neighborhood of Ikoyi. He completed his elementary education at Army Children School. He attained his secondary school certificate from Randle Secondary School and applied to study law at Delta State University in Abraka, but dropped out to concentrate on his music career. He has cited Fela Kuti, Daddy Showkey and Sizzla Kalonji as his greatest influences and role models.

== Career ==
I try to rediscover my unique selling point so that anywhere I go, it will serve as my identity. And one of my most unique traits is my vocal, the way I sing and whenever I sing, people understand and identify that this is Oritsefemi...for instance, if u are a fuji musician, Reggae star or a rapper, you must infuse afro into it because it is what rules the scene now. This Afro [was] generated from Fela Kuti.

— Oritsefemi, speaking to Vanguard about his style and approach to the music industry.

=== Before 2006: The Junglist ===
While in school, he developed himself musically and performed at parties and social gatherings. According to an interview with The Punch, his first song ever recorded was titled "Boys dey Binu" (meaning Boys are not Happy). He was also an active part of the Ajegunle-based Cherubim and Seraphim choirs. He attended a music school in Ajegunle owned by Johnny Napp, who often invites Jamaican artists to nurture the growing talents in the community. The music school also boast of breeding future reggae sensations of the 90s like Baba Fryo, Daddy Showkey and Daddy Fresh. He explained that his experience in the school added a reggae fusion into his early style of music. He released two albums with his group-mate, Chibudo. The title of the first album was also a hit track in the compilation titled Boys Dey Binu. The second album was titled Money Na Time and they both had eight tracks.

=== 2006 – 2010: Transition to solo career ===
In 2006, The Junglist Boys broke up following an obscure disagreement between the two artists making up the group.

Both artists Oritse Femi and Chi-Junglist tried to launch their individual solo careers. But only Oritse Femi hit the ground running following the release of "Elewon" and "Flog Politician" which quickly warmed him into the hearts of Ajegunle youths and music audience and later the very classic "Flog Politician" album.

However, a few months after the breakup with his group (Junglist Boys) his partner, Chibudo, stage name "Chi-Junglist" released a diss record after Oritse Femi's successful "Flog Politician" became a street anthem in Ajegunle (JMJ Quarters, Tolu, Alayabiagba, Oyewole, etc.). Chi-Junglist accused Oritse Femi of being a cheat and that it was he who deserved to be flogged and not politicians. Chi's beef track met no response from Oritse Femi as he (Oritse Femi) later went on to release another successful single "Mama Lati" which featured "Rocksteady" another Ajegunle singer.

Attempts by friends and associates of the artists to squash their beef was unsuccessful as it is believed that till date the two (Chi-Junglist and Oritse Femi) still hold grudges with each other.

According to an interview with Anna Okon of The Punch, his first solo single was "Flog Politician" which was released prior to the 2007 General elections. According to him, he was inspired to release the song due to the level of corruption in Nigeria polity. He later released his third album Elewon which translates to Chase Them in English. He started singing about corrupt political leaders and wanted to chase them out of office. His second solo album, titled Wicked World, was about the wickedness in the world. According to him, the hit track from the album "Mercy of the Lord" was inspired by his personal experiences with worldly things and how the prayers of his mom was able to salvage him by awakening the Spirit of God in him. He explained that he suffered depression while derailing from the godly upbringing, and considers himself a gospel hip-hop artist. Oritse Femi has released four albums since leaving Junglist. These albums include; "Wicked World", "Musical Taliban" and more recently "Money Stops Nonsense" sharing the same name as his record label. He has featured Da Grin, Reminisce and Pasuma Wonder. His latest album (MSN) features a handful of A-list Nigerian artists causing some people to describe "Money Stops Nonsense" as an album which lacks any purpose than to show just how much he (Oritse Femi) can get big artists on his songs.

=== 2010 – present: Double Wahala ===
On 12 September 2013, Oritse Femi released the song "Double Wahala". The Obodo-produced song is a remake of Fela Kuti's "Confusion Break Bones". Oritse Femi said he chose to remake that song because, at the time of recording, "nothing good was happening in the country with strikes, unrest and all that." It won Most Popular Song of the Year and its video was nominated for Video of the Year at the 2014 City People Music Awards. It also received a nomination for Best Pop Single and Song of the Year at The Headies 2014, Single of the Year at the 2014 edition of the Ben TV Awards, and Hottest Single of the Year at the 2014 Nigeria Entertainment Awards. In 2014, he released "Sexy Ladies" featuring Davido.

== Discography ==
=== Albums ===
- Elewon (2006)
- Wicked World (2008)
- Unfadable (2010)
- The Musical Taliban (2012)
- MSN (Money Stops Nonsense) (2015)
- Corporate Miscreant (2016)
- L.I.F.E (2017)

=== Singles ===
- "Boys dey Binu"
- "Flog Politician"
- "Money na Time"
- "Mercies of the Lord"
- "Body & Soul"
- "Redi Dance"
- "Double Wahala"
- "Sexy Ladies″
- "Ongba Larami"
- "Eyo"
- "Happy Day"
- "Awoo Ewaa"
- "Sanumi"
- "Baby Boo"
- "Baby Oku"
- "Olo Noni"
- "Igbeyawo"
- "Make Am"

=== Latest Singles ===
- "Elele"
- "Only Me"
- "Tribute to Mohbad"
- "Problem"
- "Adabi"
- "Normal Level"
- "Over Them"
- "Legally"
- "Idan"
- "God Blessings"
- "Thank God its Friday"
- "So Sexy"
- "Omolope"
- "Runmo"

== Accolades ==
Year	Event	Prize	Recipient	Result	Ref
2014	The Headies 2014	Best Street-Hop Artiste	Himself	Won	
2014	The Headies 2014	Best Vocal Performance (Male)	Oritse Femi for "Double Wahala"	Nominated	
2014	The Headies 2014	Best Collabo	"Oya Now" (Joe EL featuring Oritse Femi)	Nominated	
2014	The Headies 2014	Best Collabo	"Pass You By" (Black Magic featuring Oritse Femi)	Nominated	
2014	The Headies 2014	Best Pop Single	"Double Wahala"	Nominated	
2014	The Headies 2014	Song of the Year	"Double Wahala"	Nominated	
2014	City People Entertainment Awards	Most Popular Song of the Year	"Double Wahala"	Won	
2014	City People Entertainment Awards	Video of the Year	"Double Wahala"	Nominated	
2014	2014 Nigeria Entertainment Awards	Hottest Single of the Year	"Double Wahala"	Nominated	
2014	2014 Nigeria Entertainment Awards	Best New Act	Himself	Nominated	
2014	2014 Nigeria Entertainment Awards	Indigenous Artist of the Year	Himself	Won	
2014	2014 Nigeria Entertainment Awards	Male Artist of the Year	Himself	Nominated	
