= Kennis Music =

Record label founded in Nigeria in 1998

Kennis
- Founded: 1998
- Founder: Kehinde "Kenny" Ogungbe
- Distributor: Kennis Music
- Genre: Afrobeats, R&B, hip hop, African hip hop, pop
- Country of origin: Nigeria
- Official website: Kennis Radio

Kennis Music is a record label, specializing in Afrobeats, R&B, pop and hip hop music, founded by Nigerian radio DJ Kenny Ogungbe in the late 1990s. The company's slogan is "Africa's No 1 Record Label". The current CEOs are Kehinde "Keke" Ogungbe and Dayo "D1" Adeneye.

Lemi Ghariokwu was the main album cover designer for the artists of Kennis music.

== Current roster ==
=== Artistes ===
- Eedris Abdulkareem
- Joe EL
- Tizzy
- Deesuu

== Former artistes ==
- K.C. Presh
- OJB Jezreel (deceased)
- Mike Aremu
- Tony Tetuila
- Bola Abimbola
- Capital Femi
- 2face
- BANTU
- Goldie Harvey (deceased)
- Baba Dee
- Sound Sultan (deceased)
- Kenny Saint Brown
- Essence
- Fiokee
- Vip
- Jaywon
- Mzbel
- Sir Shina Peters
- eLDee
- Oladele Delux
- Marvelous Benjy
- Don Akingb
- Azadus

== See also ==
- List of record labels
