= Sound Sultan =

Nigerian singer-songwriter (1976 - 2021)

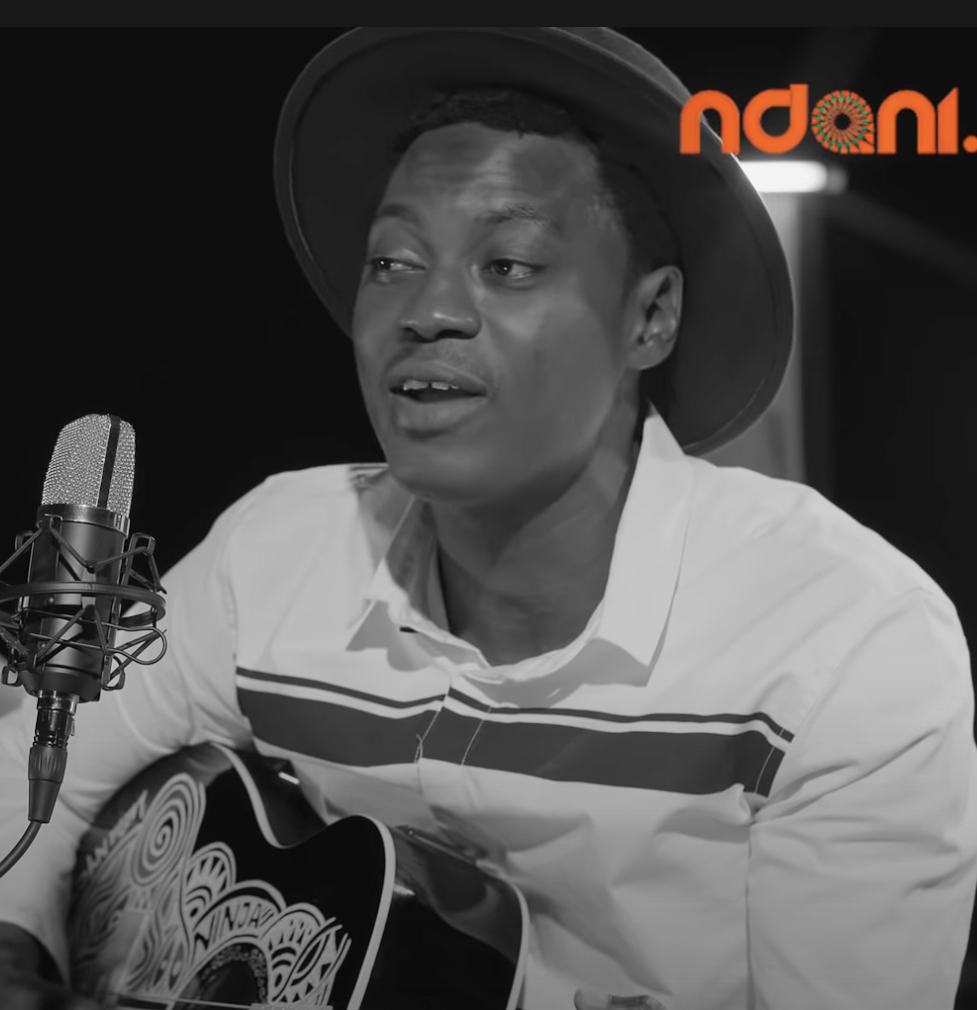

Background information
- Also known as: Sound Sultan
- Born: Olanrewaju Abdul-Ganiu Fasasi; November 27, 1976; Jos, Plateau State, Nigeria
- Origin: Yoruba
- Died: July 11, 2021 (aged 44) New Jersey, United States of America
- Genres: R&B, hip hop, reggae, Afrobeat
- Occupations: Singer-songwriter, rapper, comedian, actor, musician, record producer, executive producer, basketball club co -owner.
- Years active: 1996–2021
- Labels: Kennis Music (1997–2008); Naija Ninjas (2008–2021)

Sound Sultan (born Olanrewaju Abdul-Ganiu Fasasi; November 27, 1976 – July 11, 2021) was a Nigerian rapper, singer, songwriter, actor, comedian, and recording artist. He was regarded as one of the pacesetters of modern hip hop music in Nigeria. He was notable for using his music to speak against poverty, corruption, bad governance and societal ills in Nigeria.

== Early life ==
In 1991, he took interest in music and miming at school parties and writing his own lyrics. He attributed his early influence to his elder brother Baba Dee who studied theatre arts, and received most of his early stage experience through Baba Dee. He started learning how to play the guitar after his secondary school education and was in a band by 1999.

== Career ==
Sound Sultan's career in show business started in the 1990s, when he hosted shows to raise money for studio sessions.

By 1999, he had won numerous local talent-hunt shows. He released his first single - Mathematics "Jagbajantis" in 2000, which was a hit in Nigeria. After independently releasing other singles and featuring in hit songs of other artists, he was signed by Kennis Music.

Under Kennis Music, he released four albums. By 2007, his contract with the label expired and he partnered with Baba Dee to start Naija Ninjas, a parent organization for a record label, production outfit and clothing line. After starting as a rapper, he worked in different musical genres from R&B to Afrobeat, soul and Nigerian Fuji music. He said that artists shouldn't be judged on the genre in which they performed, that the important thing is the message conveyed in the music.

Under Naija Ninjas, he released Back From The Future (2011) and signed artists such as Karma Da Rapper, Young GreyC, Shawn (Sean Tizzle) and Blacka.

Naija Ninjas released their debut EP titled The Rebirth in 2012 and it featured the hit single Aropin which was produced by music producer Prodizzle featuring Sound Sultan, Karma & Sean Tizzle.

Sound Sultan began a working relationship with Wyclef Jean when he featured alongside 2face Idibia and Faze on "Proud to be African" from Wyclef's Welcome to Haiti: Creole 101 album. They collaborated on two other projects: "King of My Country" (2009) and "People Bad" (2012).

In 2012, it was announced that Sound Sultan was made a UN Ambassador for Peace for his exemplary lifestyle and career.

In 2015, Sound Sultan released the rap single "Remember" after a long absence from the music scene.

After the fallout of the African Basketball League, Sound Sultan joined forces with the organizers of the Continental Basketball League to become a team owner of Lagos City Stars (the 2017 champions) and a facilitator of the league entertainment.

Sound Sultan featured on Honorebel's 2019 single "Bridal" with Joe El.

== Personal life and death ==
In 2009, Sound Sultan married his long-term girlfriend Chichi Morah, now known as Farida Fasasi. They had three children.

On May 12, 2021, it was reported that Sound Sultan was somewhere in the USA receiving chemotherapy as he was reportedly diagnosed with Angioimmunoblastic T-cell lymphoma. He died on July 11, 2021, at the age of 44 as a result of complications from the illness.

Sound Sultan was the younger brother of Nigerian musical artiste, Baba Dee.

== Discography ==
- Kpsshew (2001)
- Textbook (2004)
- Naija 007 (2007)
- SS4 (2008)
- Back to The future (2010)
- Me, My Mouth and Eye (2013)
- Out of The Box (2016)
- 8th Wondah (2020)
- Reality Chq (2022)

== Awards and nominations ==
- 2012 The Headies Award for Album of the Year (Back From The Future) (nominated)
