= Eedris Abdulkareem =

Nigerian hip hop singer

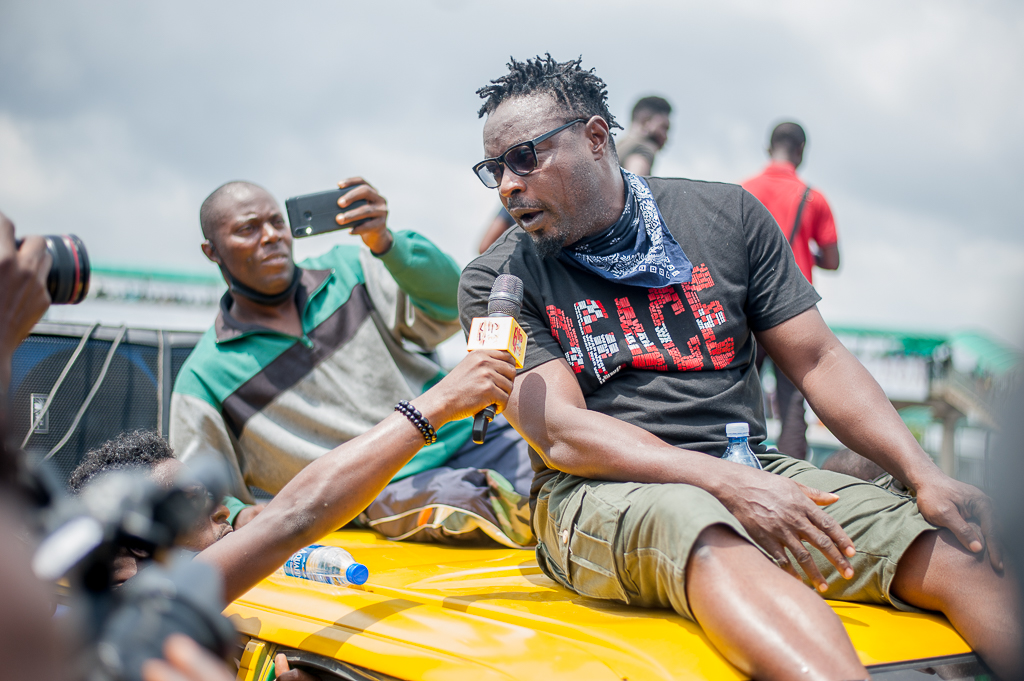
- Eedris Abdulkareem at the endSARS protest in Lagos, Nigeria

Background information
- Born: Eedris Turayo Abdulkareem Ajenifuja; Kano, Nigeria
- Origin: Osun State, Nigeria
- Genres: R&B; pop rap
- Occupations: Singer; rapper; farmer; songwriter
- Years active: 1996–present
- Labels: Kennis Music (? – 2005); La Kreem Music (2005 – present)

Eedris Turayo Abdulkareem Ajenifuja, known professionally as Eedris Abdulkareem, is a Nigerian singer and rapper. He was the lead rapper of the defunct Nigerian hip hop group The Remedies and is regarded as a pioneer of Nigerian hip-hop and one of its most influential rappers.

== Early life ==
Abdulkareem was born into a polygamous family in Kano, Nigeria. His father was from Ilesha in Osun State, and his mother was from Ogun State, both in south western Nigeria, but he adopted Kano State as his state of origin. He lost his father at the age of two and later lost eight of his older siblings.

== Career ==
Abdulkareem gained national recognition in the late 1990s as the lead rapper of The Remedies, alongside Tony Tetuila and Eddy Montana. The group played a significant role in pioneering Nigerian hip-hop, blending local languages and themes with contemporary beats. They disbanded in 2002, after which each member pursued solo careers.

In 2000, Abdulkareem was among the personalities voted for by the Nigerian public to carry the Olympic torch in a relay through the country.

In 2002, Abdulkareem launched his solo career with the album P.A.S.S (Pains And Stress = Success), followed by Mr. Lecturer, which addressed sexual harassment in Nigerian universities.

Abdulkareem's 2004 album Jaga Jaga criticised corruption and poor governance in Nigeria. The title track was banned from radio by former president Olusegun Obasanjo, but it gained significant public attention and remains one of Abdulkareem's best-known songs.

In June 2024, Addulkareem drew public attention after releasing the song "Emi Lokan". In the song, he criticised President Bola Tinubu and former president Muhammadu Buhari over the rising cost of living and criticised pastor Enoch Adeboye for not speaking out on the issue.

== Clash with 50 Cent ==
Abdulkareem and American rapper 50 Cent clashed in 2004 at Murtala Muhammed Airport in Lagos. Abdulkareem claimed he was asked to vacate a business class seat for 50 Cent which he objected. Subsequently, he was attacked by the American rapper's crew.

50 Cent and his team cancelled the rest of the Nigerian tour and left the country. In an interview, 50 cent said Abdulkareem was unprofessional and acted out of line by trying to force himself into a space reserved for G-Unit.

Abdulkareem released a diss track aimed at 50 Cent titled "Letter to Mr. President" in 2004. While the song wasn't solely about 50 Cent, he used it to criticise the Nigerian government, foreign exploitation, and referenced the airport incident.

Tony Yayo, a member of G-Unit, addressed the situation during a radio interview. He said "Some dude tried to be funny on the plane. We don't play that. We handled it."

== Personal life ==
Abdulkareem married his wife, Yetunde, in 2004. They celebrated their 19th wedding anniversary in December 2023. They have three children together.

== Kidney transplant ==
In August 2022, Abdulkareem underwent a kidney transplant at St. Nicholas Hospital in Lagos, with his wife, Yetunde, serving as the donor. He publicly expressed profound gratitude, describing her decision to donate her kidney as both shocking and deeply moving.

== Discography ==
=== Studio albums ===
- P.A.S.S (2001)
- Mr. Lecturer (2002)
- Jaga Jaga (2004)
- Letter to Mr. President (2005)
- King Is Back (2007)
- Unfinished Business (2010)
- Nothing But The Truth (2020)

=== Singles ===
- "Wonkere" featuring Fatai Rolling Dollar (2011)
- "Jaga Jaga Part 2" (2012)
- "Sekere" featuring Vector (2013)
- "Fela" featuring Femi Kuti (2013)
- "I Go Whoze You" featuring Vtek (2013)
- "Trouble Dey Sleep" featuring Konga (2016)
- "Jaga Jaga Reloaded" (2021)
- "Oti Get E" (2021)
- "Emi Lokan" (2024)
