= List of Fuji musicians =

This is a list of Fuji musicians.

Only Fuji musicians with articles are included here; for other prominent Fuji musicians see Fuji music.

== A ==
- Adewale Ayuba
- Ayinde Barriter
- Ayinla Kollington

== K ==
- K1 De Ultimate (Wasiu Omogbolahan Olasunkanmi Adewale Ayinde Marshal)
- KS1 Malaika (Sulaimon Alao Adekunle)

== O ==
- Obesere (Abass Akande Obesere)

== P ==
- Pasuma (Wasiu Alabi Pasuma)

== R ==
- Remi Aluko

== S ==
- Saheed Osupa
