= Remi Aluko =

Nigerian musician

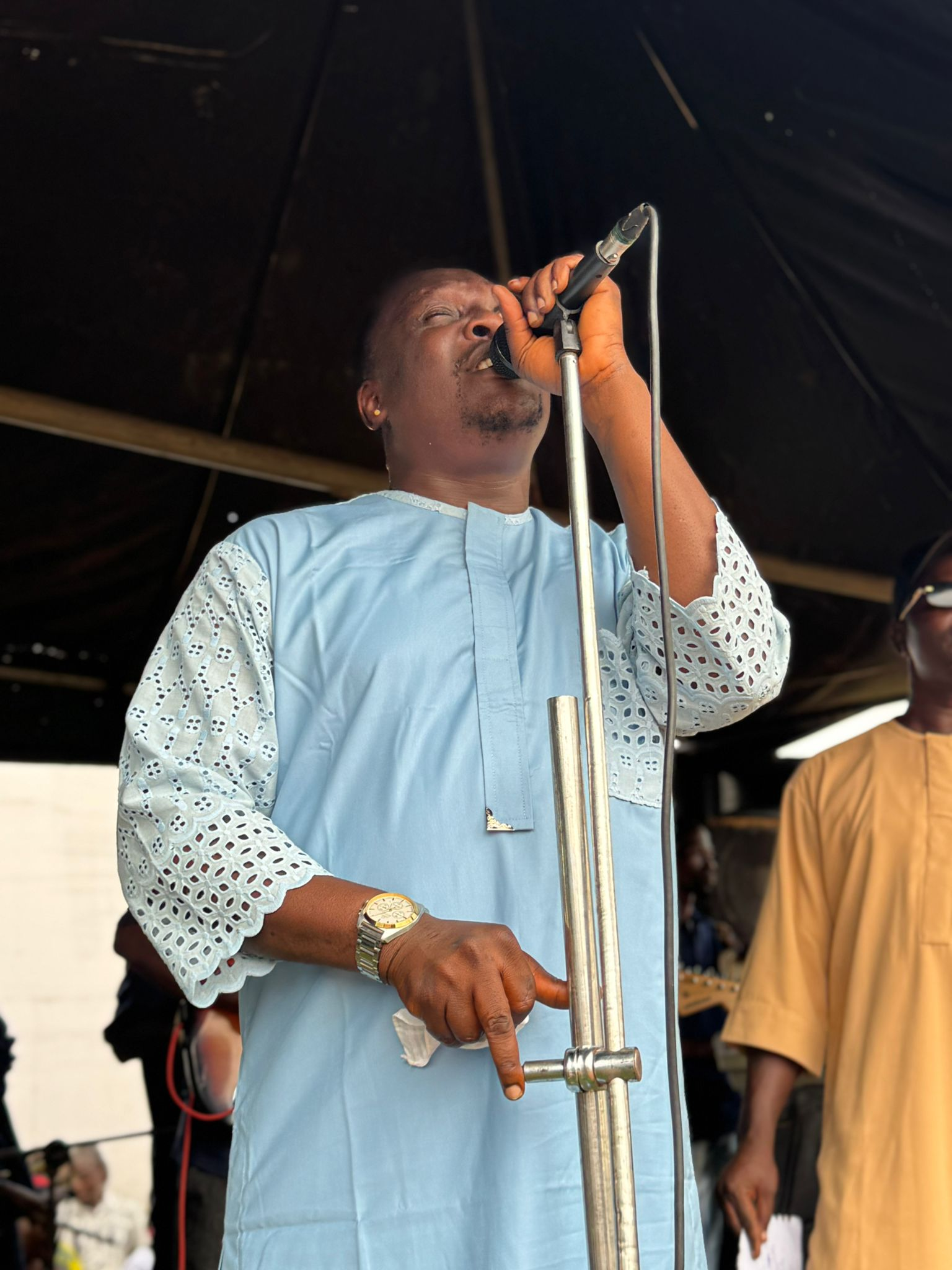

Background information
- Also known as: Igwe1, Igwe, Oba, Baba Bose, Baba Araba, Ajela
- Born: Remi Aluko; 9 September 1977 (age 48); Ebute Meta, Lagos State, Nigeria
- Origin: Ilesha, Osun State, Nigeria
- Genres: Fuji music. Hip-hop
- Occupations: Musician, actor
- Years active: 1995–present
- Label: A3 Entertainment. A3 Fuji
- Website: Remialuko.com

Remi Aluko (born September 9, 1977, in Ebute Meta, Lagos State) is a Nigerian musician. He began performing at the age of 15 and adopted a style that blends traditional Fuji rhythms with contemporary elements, performing under the name Igwe1.

== Early life ==
Aluko was born and raised in Lagos, Nigeria, where he attended Ago ijaiye Primary School in Ebute Meta. From an early age, he exhibited a deep passion for music, his father hails from Ilesha, Osun State, while his mother is from Abeokuta, Ogun State.

== Musical career ==
Aluko began performing professionally at age of 15. He made his debut in 1998 with the album Celebration, released under Oregun Records. Over the years, Aluko has released several albums, including Goodnews (1999), One time (2002/2003), The Child (2000), and Ajela (2003/2004).

Beyond his albums and recordings, he places a strong emphasis on stage plays and live concerts, he incorporates dance style (dynamic fusion of traditional alujo with fuji dance and contemporary disco movements) into his stage performances.

The Punch newspaper included Aluko in a feature listing prominent figures in Fuji music, referring to them as "Lords of Fuji music." The publication also noted that Aluko is a Christian, which it mentioned in the context of Fuji music's historical associations with Islamic influences. This observation was presented as part of a broader discussion on diversity within the genre.

In 2012, Aluko received the Merygold Fuji Music Award for Best Fuji Musician. That same year, he was named Best Fuji Artist at the Nigerian Music Awards. Both awards recognized his involvement in the Fuji music genre and were part of a series of professional acknowledgments during that period.

Aluko was in the ensemble of notable Fuji musicians, "Fuji Vibrations Concert, 'an ensemble of 12 selected notable Fuji musicians." He performed on stage alongside prominent Fuji artists like K1 De Ultimate, Saheed Osupa, Abass Obesere, KS1 Malaika, and others, in front of over 6,400 audience. This annual cultural festival is considered one of the most important showcases of Fuji music.

He has performed alongside music icon Shina Peters at the Olojo festival and headlined 2024 "Toi Toi concert, 'an event he organized in Ebute Meta" which featured reputable fuji musicians such as Obesere, Pasuma, Saheed Osupa, Malaika, and Taiye Currency. He collaborated with Konga and the late Dagrin on the fuji-street hop fusion track "Kaba Kaba" and teamed up with Alabi Pasuma in record titled "Good Example" He featured on Oritse Femi's Afro-pop track "Ijoya" (2015), and in Saheed Osupa's fuji track "Authentic."

In recent years he began advocating for Fuji musicians to embrace online streaming and digital marketing. He has emphasized the important of adapting to digital era to reach a broader audience and remain relevant in the competitive music landscape.

== Acting career ==
Aluko is best known as the Fuji musician ‘Igwe,’ he has also acted in Yoruba cinema. He played a role in the film ‘Igba,’ for which he received the Best Musician in Acting Role award at the 2014 Yoruba Movie Academy Awards (YMMA)."

== Awards ==
List of Awards and Nominations
Year	Award	Category	Result	Notes
2012	MerryGold Award	Best Fuji Musician	Winner	Best Fuji Artist at the Nigerian Music Awards
2014	Yoruba Movie Academy Awards (YMMA)	Best in a Musical Film	Winner	Best Musician in Acting Role
2023	Nigerian Music Awards	Best Fuji Artist	Winner	Recognized for excellence in Fuji music and outstanding contributions to the genre.
2021	African Music Awards	Best Traditional Artist	Nominated	Nominated for significant contributions to African traditional music.
2020	Fuji Music Awards	Best Performance	Winner	Awarded for outstanding stage presence and musical innovation.
2019	National Music Awards	Best Fuji Song	Winner	Won for the hit single "Adura" (Hypothetical song title).
2018	City People Entertainment Awards	Fuji Musician of the Year	Winner	Recognized for consistent contribution to the Fuji genre and influencing upcoming artists.
2017	Nigeria Entertainment Awards	Best Fuji Artist	Nominated	Nominated for influence on the Fuji music industry and outstanding performances throughout the year.
2015	Kora Awards	Best African Traditional Artist	Winner	Awarded for the album "Classic Fuji" and for his contributions to the African music scene.

== Notable performances ==
- Felabration (2019)
- Olojo festival (2024)
- Fuji Vibrations Festival – Muri Okunola Park, Lagos (5th edition, Dec 2024)
- Toronto Concert – Toronto, Canada (Sept 14, 2024)
- Echooroom Sections

== Selected discography ==
- Celebration (1995)
- Goodnews (1999)
- The Child (2000)
- One time (2002/2003)
- Ajela (2003/2004)
- Dublin Extra & Best Dublin Dance (2005/2006)
- Nice One (2007)
- Big Journey (2010)
- Omo Olosho (2020)
- Real (2018)
- Omode Olowo (2023)
- Trust (2022)
- Brutality (2020)
- Special Mopol (2020)
- Inside Life (2019)
- Ajo Doba (2016)
- Omo Tonso (2016)
- Special Day (2016)
- Figure 8 (2016)
- Oleku (2014)
- Indomie (2014)
- Omo Adugbo (2014)
- Boba Kan Oku (2013)
- Relentless (2026)
