= The Fuji Documentary =

Nigerian documentary film

- Directed by: Saheed Aderinto
- Produced by: Saheed Aderinto
- Starring: Kollington Ayinla, Salawa Abeni, Sefiu Alao, Ropo Ewenla, Rashidi Ayinde Merenge
- Cinematography: Saheed Aderinto
- Edited by: Aderibigbe Abiola Provost
- Release date: 2024
- Running time: 118 minutes
- Country: Nigeria
- Languages: English, Yoruba

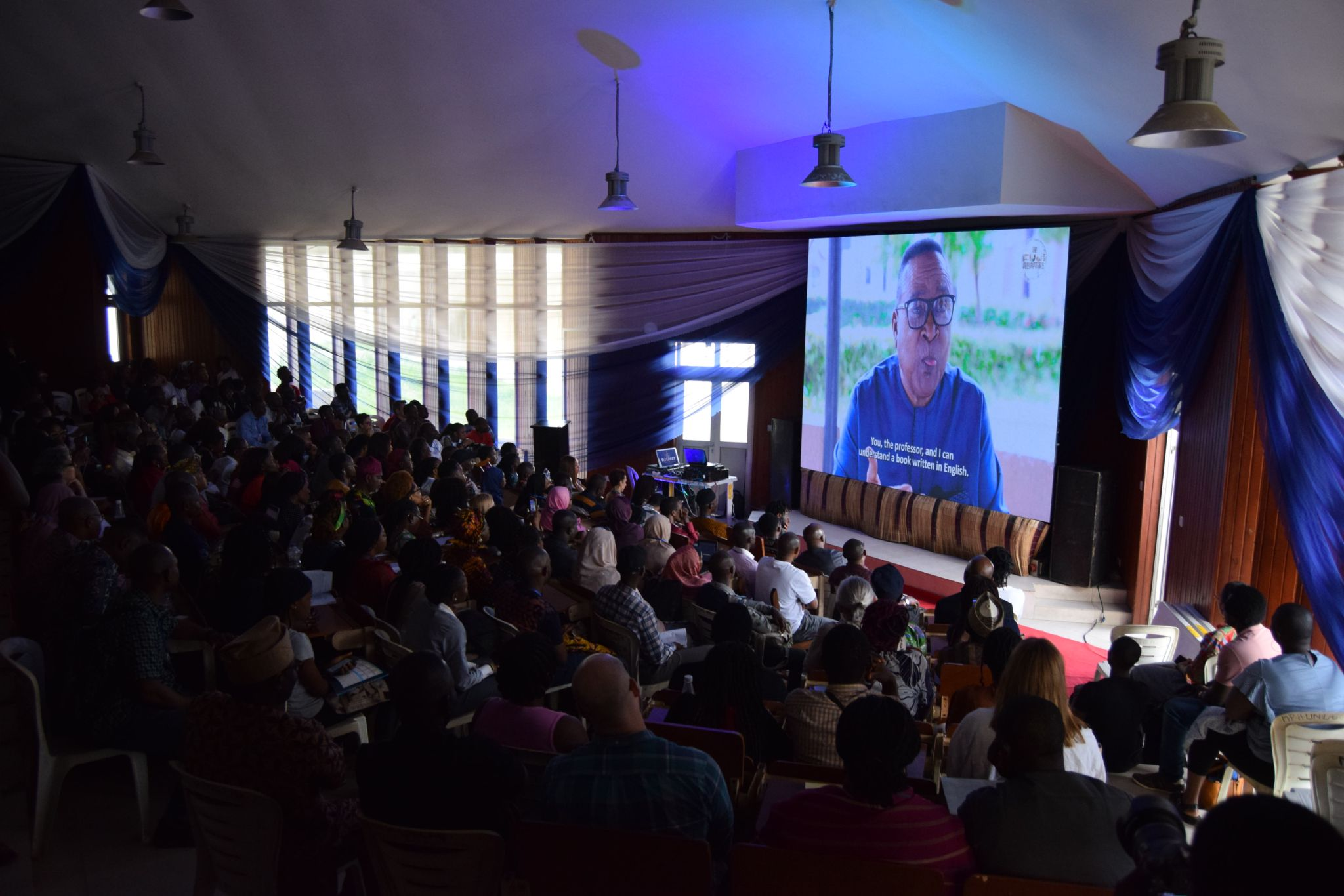
The Fuji Documentary Screening in Lagos

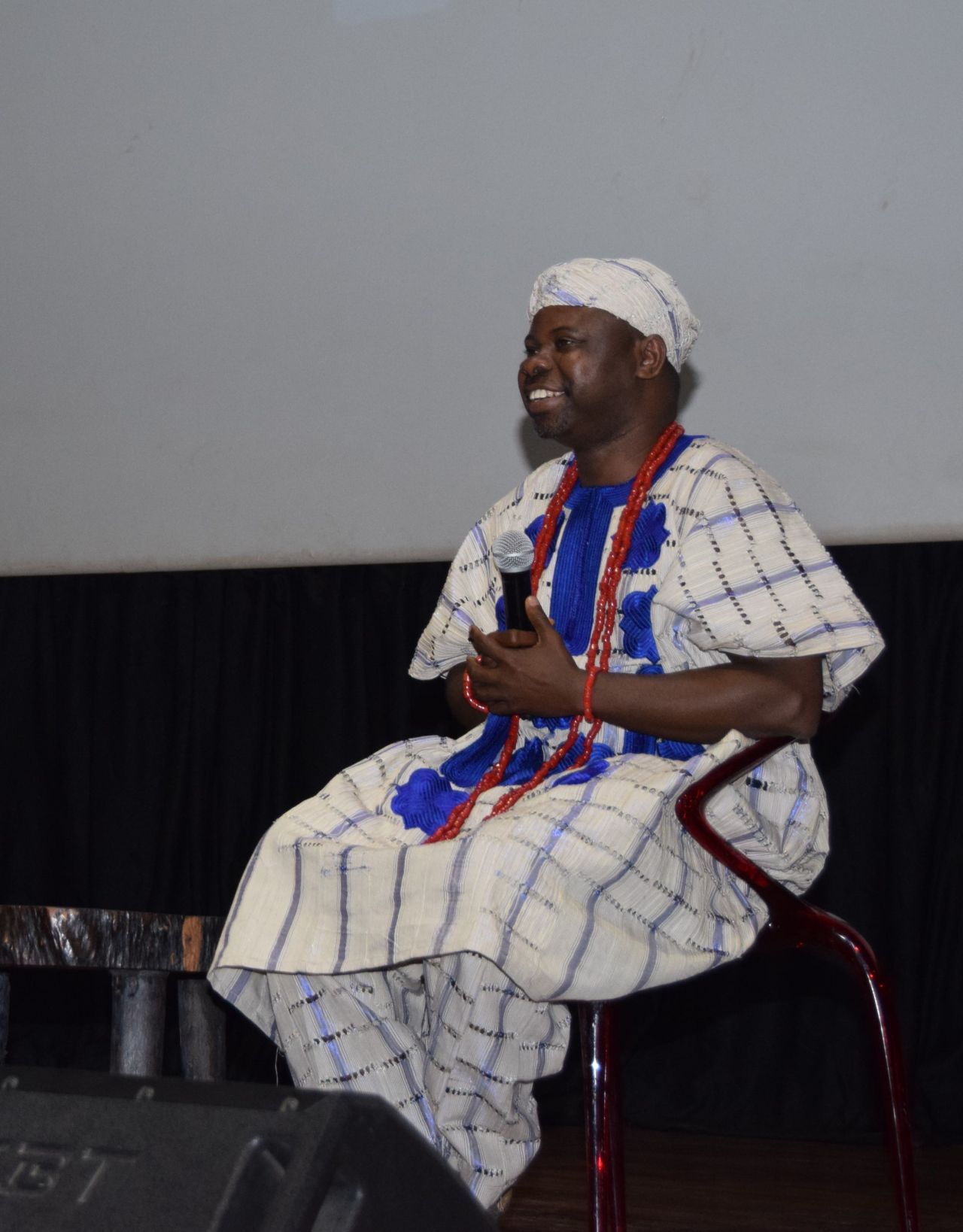
Director at iRepresent Documentary Film Festival

The Fuji Documentary is a historical documentary film produced and directed by Saheed Aderinto. The first episode titled Mr. Fuji: Barry Wonder details the life and times of Sikiru Ayinde Barrister (1948–2010), the creator of Fuji Music. It premiered in Ibadan in February 2024. Subsequent episodes of The Fuji Documentary will be released over ten years.

Critics, which include popular culture scholars, historians, and filmmakers, have described The Fuji Documentary as "a landmark in popular music documentation," "a must-see," "powerful," "trailblazing," "an oratorical-historical masterpiece" by "a master of the subject and a brilliant visual narratologist."

== Cast ==
Mr. Fuji: Barry Wonder has a total of 35 individual cast and 96 cast in total. They include Fuji artists, poets, professional actors, visual artists, journalists, biographers, and friends and family members of Sikiru Ayinde Barrister. Some of the notable casts include General Kollington Ayinla, Queen Salawa Abeni, late Isiaka Iyanda (Sawaba), Alhaji Sefiu Alao (Baba Oko), Alhaji Rashidi Ayinde (Merenge), and journalists and Fuji artists biographers such as Dayo Odeyemi, Wale Ademowo, Akintunde Akinteye, and Tunde Busari. Professional actors, including Ropo Ewenla, Moji Wonah, Olanireti Falade, and Adebisi Dedeke, were also featured in the documentary.

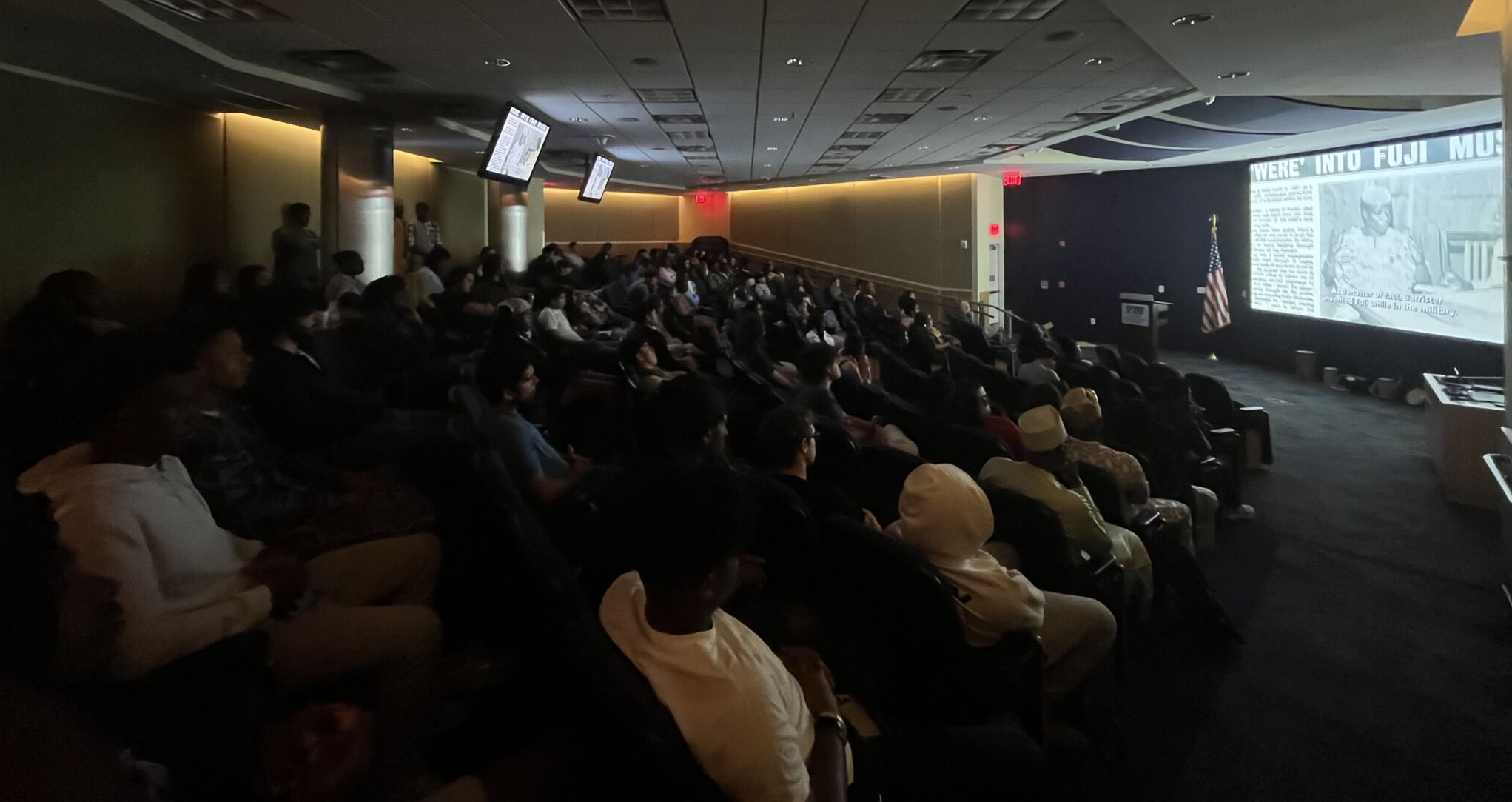
Screening in Miami, Florida

== Screenings ==
Mr. Fuji: Barry Wonder premiered in Ibadan in February 2024 as part of Barryfest, the biennial carnival, celebrating the legacies of Sikiru Ayinde Barrister. Since then, it has been screened at film festivals (such as the iRepresent International Documentary Film Festival), college campuses (Cornell University, University of Wisconsin-Madison, Ghent University, University of Lagos, Florida International University, The Polytechnic, Ibadan), public spaces, such as bars and restaurants, and academic conferences such as the African Studies Association of the United Kingdom Conference (Oxford, UK), the Lagos Studies Association Conference (Lagos, Nigeria), and the American Historical Association Conference (New York City, United States).

== Plot ==
Mr. Fuji: Barry Wonder opens with a general introduction to the creative efflorescence of the 1970s, made possible by millions of dollars in revenue from the global oil boom. Fuji made its transition from a religious musical genre, performed only during the holy month of Ramadan, to a secular all-year-round music, because of the transformation in the Nigerian musical culture during the 1970s, allowing several musicians to achieve enormous financial and creative success.

The documentary then went into the life history of Sikiru Ayinde Barrister, from his birth in Lagos in 1948, to the challenges he encountered growing up, and the numerous musical competitions he participated in as a teenager. It then chronicles his first recorded album in 1966, his enlistment into the Nigerian army in 1968, and the birth of Fuji music as a distinct genre by the second half of the 1970s.

Different sections of the documentary focus on how Fuji was introduced to the global world through Barrister's international tours, the break-up of his band, the creative genius of his lead percussionists (especially Kamoru Ayansola and Aderoju Yekini), his creative process, family life, his political art, his fight with publicist Olabisi Ajala, death in December 2010, and the attempts by his global fans to promote his legacy.

== Scenery and location ==
The Fuji Documentary was shot in Nigeria, the United States, and the United Kingdom. The Nigerian locations include the Tunde Odunlade Art Gallery (Ibadan); the Institute of African Studies and the Wole Soyinka Arts Theatre (University of Ibadan); The Museum of Natural History and the Department of Creative Arts (University of Lagos); the National Archives of Nigeria, Ibadan; the Department of Music Technology (The Polytechnic Ibadan); The J. F. Ade Ajayi Library (Ibadan); The Oyo State House of Assembly (Ibadan), among private homes and public spaces.

== Reception ==
Professor Emerita Karin Barber says of the film: "The director and producer of the film, Professor Saheed Aderintọ, is a leading cultural historian and authority on Nigerian popular music. Though factually detailed and sophisticated in approach, the dominant note is one of respectful admiration for a unique cultural figure [Sikiru Ayinde Barrister]. The film is beautifully put together and entirely captivating—a landmark in popular music documentation. Àjànàkú kọjá "Mo rí nǹkan fìrí", bá a bá rérin, ká a sọ pé a rérin! [It's impossible to deny sighting an elephant.]"

Jesse Weaver Shipley, the John D. Willard Professor of African and African American Studies and Oratory at Dartmouth College comments that "Saheed Aderinto is a masterful storyteller who successfully brings his prodigious skills as a historian to documentary filmmaking. This film brilliantly tells the story of Fuji music as it emerges in the cultural efflorescence of post-independence Nigeria and then goes global. This film is a must-see for music fans and anyone interested in understanding the creative spark currently igniting Nigerian music, film, and art."

Dami Ajayi submits that The Fuji Documentary is "an overwhelming experience, in a good way. It is a well-deserved and wholesome profile of the music genre Fuji and its frontal innovator, Barrister Sikiru Ayinde, a.k.a. Mr. Fuji. This timely intervention from a seasoned academic, Professor Saheed Aderinto, who is vocal about his love for Fuji…[He] provides us with a tender story explored with academic rigour and profound cultural understanding. His scholarly approach to the subject matter is sure to stimulate your intellectual curiosity."

Fatai Adisa Folorunso remarks: "The clear visuals, crisp sound, and seamless narrative transitions make the documentary not only engaging but also educational ... Aderinto's work gives us a multifaceted approach that combines the skills of a journalist, critic, cinematographer, historian, entertainer, and academic to produce a comprehensive and compelling piece ... The Fuji Documentary is a tour de force that blends academic rigor with artistic flair. Professor Aderinto's ability to weave cultural history with personal narratives makes this work an invaluable resource for understanding Sikiru Ayinde Barrister's Fuji's legacy."

Another reviewer submitted: "As a leading social and cultural historian of modern Nigeria, Aderinto brings this important musical tradition to those who may have never even heard the word "fújì." He’s traveled to Lagos, Ibadan and other cities, visiting libraries, museums and universities to interview different fújì artists. Everything he learned, Aderinto shared in real-time with his deeply engaged audience on social media — part of his commitment to make research accessible to all people."
