= Aṣíkò =

Music genre

Ashiko
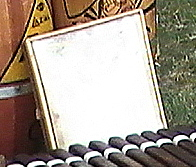

Percussion instrument
- Classification: African Percussion instrument. The heads are goatskin or antelope, depending on the size of the instrument, while the body is made of sawed wooden boards.
- Hornbostel–Sachs classification: 211.261.1 (Directly struck membranophones, goblet drums, one membrane, open at one end)

Related instruments
- Sakara, Pandeiro,

More articles or information
- Talking drum

Aṣíkò (Ashiko) is a musical genre similar to sákárà music from Nigeria, West Africa. Aṣíkò was the Christian version of sákárà (Sakara).

== Background ==
It developed originally as a type of syncretic street drumming in port towns throughout Anglophone West Africa. By the 1920s it was also played by musicians inland in Yoruba towns like Abęokuta and Ibadan. Isaac O. Delano gives a detailed description of an aṣíkò ensemble in the 1930s:

Another popular native dance is the "Ashiko". It is not a Yoruba dance in its origin, but was imported from Sierra Leone or somewhere that way. The "Ashiko" dance is chiefly performed by Christian people, and has only one kind of music, rather quicker than the "Sakara" . . . and resembles a fox-trot. No stringed instruments are employed, only drums and a carpenter's saw, used occasionally to make a kind of noise on its sharp edge, as an embellishment to "Ashiko" drum music. Sometimes a bottle is also used, a nail beating time on it, for the same purpose. The drummers, five in number, all beat similar drums, and produce a continuous volume of music. The dancing is done by pairs, two ladies and two gentlemen facing each other. The drummers sing as in the "Sakara" dance with chorus boys, but no one else sings with them (Delano [1937] 1973:157)."

Aṣíkò music has its origins in the music of Sierra Leonean repatriates, from the West Indian colonies, who themselves had been influenced by Afro-Brazilian samba music. The wooden frame drums used in aṣíkò music and the carpenter's saw, were introduced by the Aguda, who introduced modern carpentry techniques to the Yoruba artisans. Often, elderly informants use the terms aṣíkò and sámbà interchangeably. Aṣíkò was popular in Accra, the capital of the Gold Coast Colony before World War I. Other influences are also possible from Dahomean, Liberian and West Indian immigrants.

Lagos was a breeding ground for young Christian musicians playing aṣíkò music. They developed and rehearsed their own versions of holiday songs, for various festivals around Christmas, etc. Then when the day arrived they would take to the streets and compete. With the elders as judges, the best group would take home a cash prize. The aṣíkò drum, a square frame drum, complete with tuning pegs, was perfect for marching in a parade. It was hand held, lightweight and easy to play with one hand. The drums are made in different sizes and played using interlocking rhythms, which create a driving beat that's difficult to resist as the band marches through the streets.

Delano noted European musical influences, since there is no call and response tradition within this genre. The drummers themselves are the singers.

== Influence ==
The success of these amateur aṣíkò groups resulted in a number of them becoming full-time professional bands, which eventually entered the recording studios allowing them to reach a larger audience and become quite popular. Musicians such as A.B.O. Mabinuori, Amusa (otherwise known as 'Captain'), Jero, Tesilimi, Samu Egbo ("Samu Esu"), Ajayi Williams (alias "Ajayi Koboko") and Alabi Labilu are just a few of the most popular aṣíkò bandleaders.

This syncretized music was the perfect match for the newly indoctrinated Christian converts of the day, because it incorporated "foreign" instruments with no ties to traditional religious practices; lyrical poetic song texts promoting Christianity over the òrìṣà (traditional religion) and the songs were sung in either Yoruba or Nigerian Pidgin English, which made them accessible to a large cross-section of the population.

As the music grew in popularity the song texts began to change as well. By the late 1920s songs could be heard about important social events, historical events, current events and low-status occupations, like prostitution, etc.

Nigerian musician Babatunde Olatunji incorporated many of these elements into his music. The samba rhythm was one of his favorites, heard on many of his albums. Much like the rhythm of James Brown identified him and his music; the samba rhythms identify the music of Olatunji. Typically, he did not use sets of drums, but rather created batteries of drums. For instance, atsimevu, djembe, congas and dunun would be played together. In the latter part of his career he also introduced a drum, now identified with him, the Boku drum from Cuba, under the name aṣíkò (ashiko). For most American drummers this is the ashiko drum, as opposed to the hand held relative of the Spanish Pandeiro. In light of his Yoruba origins and Christian upbringing, it all makes sense. As we look at his recordings we see everything from songs like Bethlehemu to Shango and from Sahara Samba to Mbira which features, not Mbira as we know it but rather, a Cuban style Marimbula or Agidigbo as it is known in Nigeria.

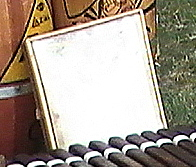
An Aṣíkò (Ashiko) drum from Nigeria, West Africa

== See also ==
- Sakara drum
- Ashiko drum

== Bibliography ==
- Howard, Joseph H., 1982. Drums. Self-published catalog of Dr. Howard's extensive collection of drums. L.A., CA.
- Waterman, Christopher A., 1990. Juju: A Social History and Ethnography of an African Popular Music. University of Chicago Press.
- Dietz, Elisabeth Hoffmann, Olatunji, 1965. Michael Babatunde, Musical Instruments of Africa; Their Nature, Use, and Place in the Life of a Deeply Musical People. John Day Company
