= Aluko =

Aluko is a Nigerian surname. Notable people with the surname include:

- Eni Aluko (born 1987), English footballer
- Gbenga Aluko (1963–2021), Nigerian senator
- Remi Aluko (born 1977), Nigerian Musician
- Olabade Aluko (born 2006), English footballer
- Sone Aluko (born 1989), Nigerian footballer
- Sope Aluko (born 1975), Nigerian actress
- T. M. Aluko (1918–2010), Nigerian writer
