= Yusuf Olatunji =

Yusuf Olatunji Joseph Olatunji
- Also known as: Baba Legba, Baba L'Egbaa
- Born: c. 1905; Gbegbinlawo, Ogun State (or Iseyin, Oyo State), Nigeria
- Origin: Southwestern Nigeria
- Died: December 15, 1978 (aged 73)
- Genre: Sakara music
- Instruments: Vocals, Sakara drum
- Years active: 1927–1978
- Labels: Philips, Zareco, Badejo's Sound Studios, Premier Music
- Formerly of: Abibu Oluwa band

Yusuf Olatunji (c. 1905 – December 15, 1978), also affectionately known as Baba Legba or Baba L'Egbaa, was a Nigerian recording artist, vocalist, and Sakara drum player who played a pivotal role in popularizing the Sakara music genre.

== Early life ==
Olatunji was purportedly born in 1905 or 1906 in Gbegbinlawo, a village in Ogun State, southwestern Nigeria, although some historical accounts suggest he hailed from Iseyin in Oyo State. He was born into a Christian family and was originally named Joseph Olatunji.

In his mid-life, he converted to Islam, changing his first name to Yusuf. This conversion notably boosted his career, allowing him to integrate deeply into the socio-cultural and religious fabric of Yoruba Muslim society, which heavily patronized Sakara music.

== Musical career and style ==
Olatunji began his professional musical journey when he joined the Abibu Oluwa band in 1927. He released his first record in 1937, marking the beginning of a prolific recording career that would span over four decades and yield more than 50 records. Due to a severe accident, Olatunji lost the use of his limbs and spent the better part of his career confined to a wheelchair; however, this did not hinder his ability to perform, run roadshows, or release music.

As a master of the Sakara drum, Olatunji transformed the traditional genre into a popular music style enjoyed across the southwestern region of Nigeria. His musical compositions utilized standard Sakara rhythmic patterns, including complex hemiolas and cross-rhythms (such as mirroring 12/8 and 4/4 meters), which heavily defined the identity of the Islam-influenced neo-traditional genre.

Throughout his career, Olatunji was closely associated with wealthy elites, business tycoons, and prominent social clubs in Yorubaland, who served as his patrons. He frequently composed philosophical praise songs for notable figures, including Lamidi Durowoju, Jimoh Ishola, Raji Orire, and Badejo Okunsanya. His relationship with Alhaja Kuburatu Abike Adebisi, a wealthy Abeokuta businesswoman popularly known as "Cash Madam," was particularly significant; she notably funded his medical trip abroad for a major surgery.

== Personal life and death ==
Olatunji was a polygamist, married to three wives with whom he had four children. He died on December 15, 1978, at the age of 74. His funeral was heavily attended by prominent figures in Nigerian politics and the local music industry, cementing his legacy as a Yoruba cultural icon.

== Discography ==
Olatunji released dozens of albums, particularly on the Philips and Zareco labels. Below is a selected discography of his studio albums and volume releases.

Volume / Title	Year	Label / Catalog Numbers	Notable Tracks / Patrons Featured
In Action Vol. 1	1969	Philips (PL 13411); Premier Music (PLCD 007)	Surakaty Eki, Jimoh Gbensola, Bolowo Bate, Egbe Iwajowa (Ijebu-Ode)
Plays Sakara Volume 2	1969	Philips West African (PL 13413); Zareco (Z.O.N13413)	Ajala Jinadu, Alhaji Mustafa Dabiri, Salawu Adejola, Egbe Oredegbe (Egba)
Plays Sakara Volume 3	1969	Philips West African (PL 13414); Premier Music (PLCD 008)	Tijani Akinyele, Alimi Okerayi, Sule Apena, Abudu Amodemaja
In Action Vol. 4	1969	Philips (PL 13422); Premier Music (PLCD 003)	Kuye Dada, Lamidi Durowoju, Asa Mba Eiyele Sere
Vol. 5 (Beriwa Ekiwa)	c. 1969	Zareco (ORSL 1302)	Alhaji Raufu Salawu, Beriwa Ekiwa, Boti Sefun Mi, Egbe Oredegbe (Agege)
In Action Vol. 6 (Oye Kani Fura)	1970	Philips (PL 6386007); Premier Music (PLCD 009)	Nofiu Lashoju, Datemi Lare, O Ye Kani Fura, Egbe Ifelodun Kenta
Vol. 7 (E Ma F'ojowu Meji Dele)	c. 1970	Zareco (ORSL 1301)	Memudu Amoo Abolade, Alhaji Olanrewaju Oseni, Late Alimi Orerayi
Vol. 8 (Toba Oluwa Ni Yio Se)	c. 1970	Zareco; Premier Music (PLCD 024)	Alhaji M. Tolani, Kubura Abike Adebisi (Cash Woman), Egbe Ifenirepo
In Action Vol. 9	1971	Badejo's Sound Studio (BBA 3004R); Zareco (ORSR1303)	T. Ayinde Shonibare, Shittu Olafuyi, Lamide Adedibu, Comfort Seriki
In Action Vol. 10 (Otegbola)	c. 1971	Philips (PL 6386022); Premier Music (PLCD 021)	Mudasiru Otegbola, Titilayo Ejire, Raimi Balogun, Sikiru Balogun
Vol. 12 (Iranse Lowo Je)	c. 1972	Zareco	Raimi Ayinla Mogaji, Lamina Alabede, Alaru Durowoju
Vol. 13 (Asiko Wa Ni)	c. 1972	Zareco	Alimi Sanusi, Chief Olorun Tele, Alhaji Sufianu Akande
Vol. 14	c. 1972	Zareco (ORSL 1701)	Late Badejo Okusanya, Lasisi Karaole, Oba Alake of Egba Land
Vol. 15 (Onitire)	1973	Philips (PL 6361031); Premier Music (PLCD 018)	Jimoh Olojo (Itire), Sunmonu Akanbi Olori, Karimu Olota
Vol. 16 (Ojise Nla)	1973	Zareco (ORSL 1703)	Late Lasisi Omo Layemi, Muraina Clundegun, Oloye Egba
Vol. 17 (Yegede)	c. 1973	Philips (PL 6361050); Premier Music (PLCD 010)	Kuburatu Adebisi Edioseri, Sule Esinlokun, Awon Oba Eko
Vol. 18	1974	Zareco (ORSL 1706)	Alhaji Akanbi Awolesu, Governor Rotimi, Salawu Amoo Arikuyeri
In Action Vol. 19 (Se Eni Kosi)	c. 1974	Philips (PL 6361066); Premier Music (PLCD 005)	Ayinde S. Kenkenke, Jinadu Esho, Raufu Are Atan Nagbowo
Vol. 20 (Omo T'i O Gba Eko Ile)	c. 1974	Zareco (ORSL 1708)	Chief Lasisi Oseni, Alhaji Salisu Majek, Rasaki Keshiro
Vol. 21 (Ijimere Sogigun)	c. 1974	Philips (PL 6361089); Premier Music (PLCD 001)	Lamidi Akinola, Asani Komolafe, Falilatu Shoga
Vol. 22 (Iwa)	1975	Zareco (ORSL 1711); Olatunji (CMP008)	Shewu Bakare, Alhaja Musili Ashake, Lamina Ojugbele
Vol. 23 (Olowo Lagba)	c. 1975	Premier Music (PLCD 004)	Fasasi Olowobuso, Alhaji Salimonu Lawal, Egbe Osupa Egba
Vol. 24 (Oba Oluwa Loni Dede)	1976	Zareco (ORSL 1717)	Olorun Oba L'o Ni Dede, Mo Ranti Baba Kan, S. Abeni
Vol. 25 (Kafi Ara Wa Sokan)	1976	Philips (PL 6361160); Premier Music (PLCD 019)	Adeleke Ashata, Mukadasi Aregbe, Salamotu Abiosoye Oliyide
Vol. 26 (Ogun State)	1977	Zareco (ORSL 1721)	Late Murtala Muhammed, Alhaji Oloruntele Olukoya, Ogun State
Vol. 27 (Orin Tokotaya)	1977	Philips (PL 6361256); Premier Music (PLCD 006)	Alhaji Adetunji Adenekan, Alhaja Lati Ladejobi, Sinotu Abeke
In Action Vol. 28 (Ef' Omo Fun Alapata)	c. 1977	Zareco (ORSL 1725)	Alhaji Rasidi Shoyoye, Alhaji Lasisi Akinshola, Ramoni Shanusi
Vol. 29 (Ilu Osugbo)	1978	Philips (PL 6361335); Zareco	Surakatu Akinbola, Alhaji Yekini Ajala, Lawrence Aina
Vol. 30	1978	Zareco (ORSL 1729)	Alhaji Samusi Ayorinde, Alhaji Musitafa Oyeleke, Sufianu Ogunwolu
Vol. 32	c. 1978	Zareco (ORSL 1731)	Iba Abibu-Oluwa, Alhaji Akinpelu, Alhaji Salabiu Ladejobi
Vol. 33 (Adegbenro)	1980	Zareco (FTLP 107); Premier Music (PLCD 024)	Late Alhaji Adegbenro, Bakare Ajani Olagunju, Kasunmu Isola Sanni
Vol. 35 (Oloye Faji)	1981	Zareco (ORSL 1737)	Alhaji Raufu Kube-Kube, Rabiatu Ayoka (Oloye Faji of Lagos)
Vol. 36 (Ore Marun)	c. 1981	Zareco; Premier Music (PLCD 025)	Alhaji Olatinwa Aderemi, Alhaji Akande Falahan, Alhaji Ishau Lawal
Vol. 37 (Mapada Leyin Mi Oba Oluwa)	1981–82	Zareco (ORSL 1739)	Chief Adeniyi Idowu, Jinadu Ogunbayo, Alhaji Ashiru Olona
Baba O 5	1987	Zareco (ORSL 1742)	Waidi Orelope, Larimu Seriki, Rabiu Shodunke, Shitu Dokunmu
