= Gudugudu =

Traditional Yoruba drum

Drummer playing the gudugudu with two lashes

Gudugudu is a traditional drum used by the Yoruba ethnic group of Nigeria. The gudugudu is a time keeping drum for the dundun family of drums that are said to mimic speech. It is designed to produce a sharp and loud beat that all the other drummers can hear and keep in time with. The gudugudu player, in turn, takes his cues from the master drummer who plays a large talking drum, or dun-dun. It can be seen and experienced in modern sekere, fuji, apala and possibly juju cultural performances.

== Design ==
The gudugudu drum is shaped like a bowl. It is round, small, and has a single animal skin drum head. The gudugudu is played with two thin and semi-flexible dried rolled sticks or "lashes" made of cow skin (in its dried form commonly called "rawhide").

== See also ==
Music of Nigeria
