= Abibu Oluwa =

Nigerian musician

Abibu Oluwa was a Nigerian musician who was an early exponent of the Yoruba musical genre known as sakara. He is regarded as the first breakout star of this musical genre. Oluwa was prominent in the late 1920s and 1930s when he recorded for Odeon, HMV and Parlophone Records. His recordings for Odeon were some of the earliest Yoruba musical recordings; he sang many praise songs for Lagos elites of his time.

Sakara musicians Yusuf Olatunji and Lefty Salami were members of his band. Olatunji joined his band in the late 1920s.

== Discography ==
- Macaulay Ati Tijani Oluwa, Yoruba (Sakara) and Buraimoh Eku, Yoruba (Sakara). Odeon A 248505
- Alli Balogun, Alli Oloko, Yoruba (sakara) and Sanni Adewale, Sakara. Odeon A 248506
- Ni Jo Ti AkoAko Daiye, Yoruba (sakara) and Raji Fujah. Odeon A 248507
- Orin Eshubayi, Yoruba and Tukuru Ajibabi. Odeon A 248534
- Orin Alake Oba Abeokuta and Orin Oshodi. Odeon A 248535
