= Saheed Aderinto =

Nigerian-American writer and historian

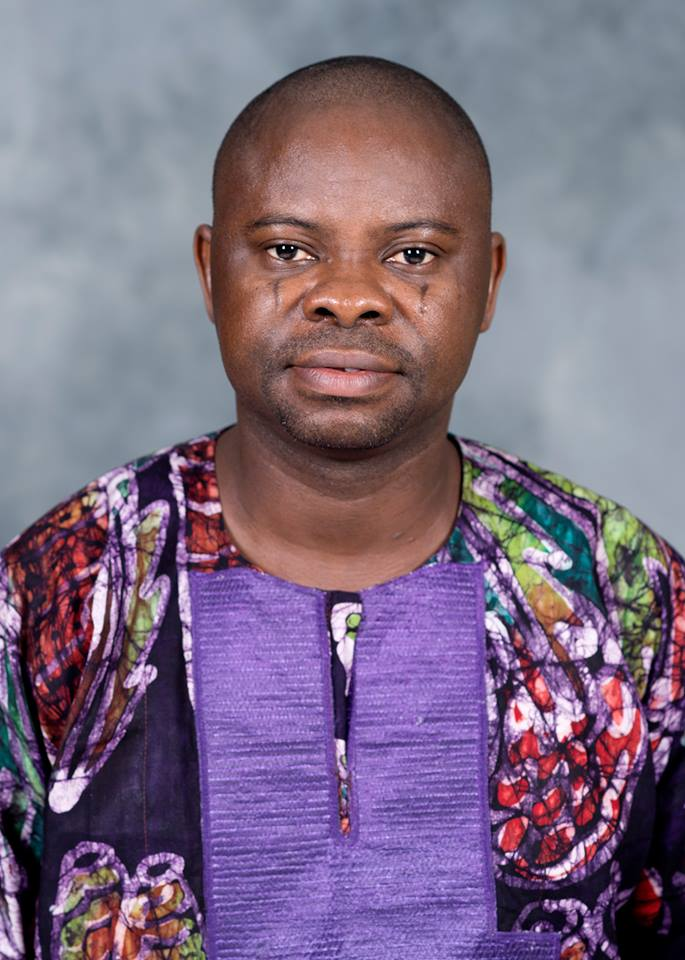
- Born: January 22, 1979 (age 47); Ibadan, Oyo State, Nigeria
- Education: University of Ibadan; University of Texas, Austin
- Occupations: Professor, historian, filmmaker, writer
- Employer: Florida International University
- Known for: Historical scholarship
- Notable work: Animality and Colonial Subjecthood: The Human and Nonhuman Creatures of Nigeria; Guns and Society in Colonial Nigeria
- Spouse: Olamide Aderinto
- Children: Itandola • Itandayo
- Awards: 2023 Dan David Prize; Nigerian Studies Association Book Prize for "When Sex Threatened the State."
- Website: www.saheedaderinto.com

Saheed Aderinto (born January 22, 1979) is a Nigerian American Professor of History and African and African Diaspora Studies at Florida International University, an award-winning author, and a filmmaker. He is the Founding President of the Lagos Studies Association. In February 2023, Aderinto received the $300,000 Dan David Prize–the largest financial reward for excellence in the historical discipline in the world in recognition of his “outstanding scholarship that illuminates the past and seeks to anchor public discourse in a deeper understanding of history.” He has published eight books, thirty-six journal articles and book chapters, forty encyclopedia articles, and twenty book reviews. His debut documentary film, The Fuji Documentary premiered in February 2024.'

== Biography ==
Aderinto was born in Ibadan (Nigeria) on January 22, 1979. He completed his elementary school education at Adeen International School in 1990 and secondary school at Ibadan City Academy in 1996. He then went on to earn a BA in History from the University of Ibadan in 2004. Aderinto moved to the United States in 2005 to study at the University of Texas at Austin, where he received his MA and PhD in 2007 and 2010, respectively. In Fall of 2010, he started his teaching career at Western Carolina University, Cullowhee NC. In Fall 2022, Aderinto started a new position as Professor of History and African and African Diaspora Studies at Florida International University.

== Scholarship ==
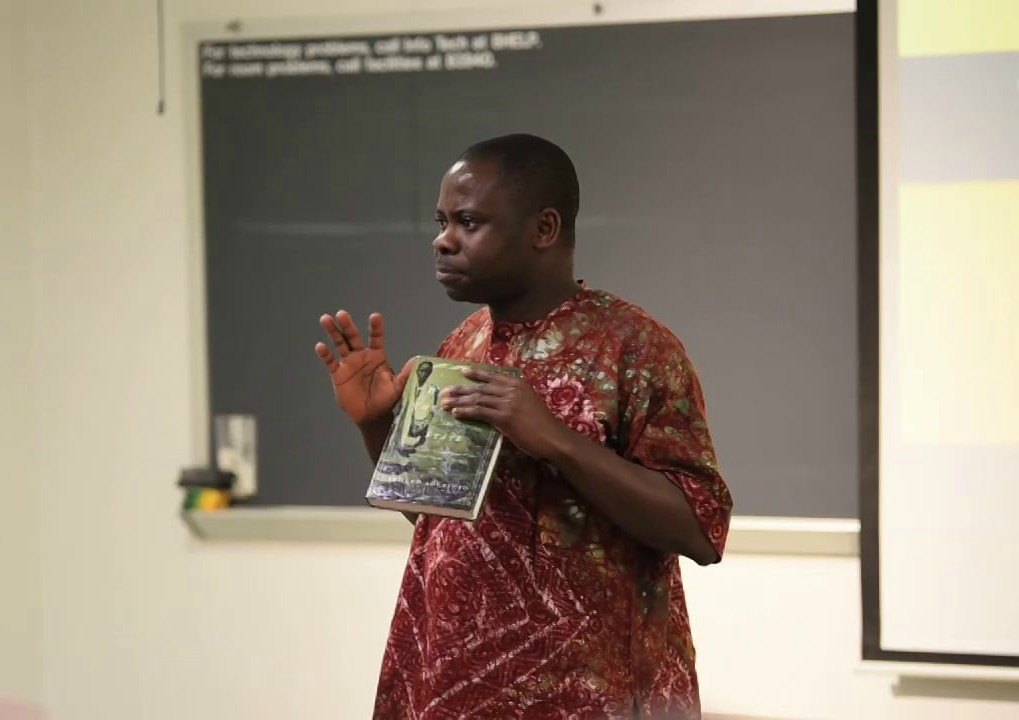

Aderinto is influenced by a "total" approach to historical research. Instead of locating historical ideas or events solely within a specific branch of history (such as social, political or economic), Aderinto adopts a holistic approach that borrows vocabulary, methodology, and discursive tools from a wide range of disciplines and sub-disciplines. He is driven by ideas that do not "over-compartmentalize" history but connect diverse strands of knowledge in understanding the past. From works on children and sexuality to guns and animals, he has expanded the frontiers of Nigerian history, disturbing disciplinary boundaries in meaningful ways.

Aderinto's publications conform to the research agenda of the "Third Wave of Historical Scholarship on Nigeria." Scholars of this era of Nigerian history, as he demonstrated in one of his books with a similar title, are ideologically motivated by the need to show the importance of history to contemporary Nigeria. Aderinto is drawn to themes like sexuality, which his predecessors hesitated to write about and under-researched populations like children, placing their experience at the center of colonial discourse of modernity. Furthermore, he challenges the rigid binary between colonial and postcolonial ideas by demonstrating that historical periods should not be treated with undue rigidity; rather historians should recognize the continuity and change in core structures and processes that produced them. Aderinto is definitely not the first historian to articulate the need to connect precolonial, colonial, and postcolonial Nigerian history to form a holistic thread of ideas. However, he is one of the few scholars putting this into practice by devoting carefully written epilogues focusing on postcolonial period to books on the colonial period—while also providing a separate chapter on the precolonial period. Aderinto's scholarship on love, romantic passion, and emotions, stand at the crossroads of gender, race, social class, and power formation across time and space.

Aderinto is the author of When Sex Threatened the State: Illicit Sexuality, Nationalism, and Politics in Colonial Nigeria, 1900–1958 (University of Illinois Press, 2015) winner of the 2016 Nigerian Studies Association’s Book Award Prize for the “most important scholarly book/work on Nigeria published in English language.” The book examines "the intersection of sex work and the imperial project in British Nigeria." It has been described as "The first comprehensive history of sexuality of colonial Nigeria." It "combines the study of a colonial demimonde with an urban history of Lagos and a look at government policy to reappraise the history of Nigerian public life." Another critic thought that "Saheed Aderinto has produced a very important contribution to African social history and Nigerian historiography ''When Sex Threatened the State has been reviewed in more than a dozen journals, including the Canadian Journal of African Studies, American Historical Review, International Journal of African Historical Studies, Africa: the Journal of the International African Institute, Canadian Journal of History, Journal of the History of Sexuality, Journal of West African History, the Historian, and Journal of Colonialism and Colonial History, among others.

He is also the author of Guns and Society in Colonial Nigeria: Firearms, Culture, and Public Order (Indiana University Press, 2018). The book examines the evolution of Nigeria into a gun society during the first half of the twentieth century. In this book, Aderinto details the complex interactions between Nigerians and guns as a significant element of African colonial encounter.

Aderinto is the first Nigerian to be awarded the prestigious Dan David Prize. Announcing the winners in February 2023, the selection committee lauded Aderinto’s work for "situating African history at the cutting edge of diverse literatures in the histories of sexuality, nonhumans, and violence, noting that it is exceptional to see a single person leading scholarship in all of these fields."

== Filmmaking ==
In February 2024, Aderinto premiered the first episode of his documentary film, The Fuji Documentary. Since then, it has been screened at academic conferences, documentary film festivals, public spaces, and university campuses in Africa, Europe, and North America. The first episode chronicles the life and times of Sikiru Ayinde Barrister, the pioneer of Fuji music, which has now become a major popular culture of the Yoruba people of southwestern Nigeria and the global African diaspora, influencing a wide range of music genres including Afrobeats and contemporary Nigerian gospel music. Emeritus Professor Karin Barber describes The Fuji Documentary as "a landmark in popular music documentation." In an interview he granted to The Conversation, in April 2024 he explains how Fuji transformed from a religious to a secular music in the 1970s.

== Lagos Studies Association ==
The history of the Lagos Studies Association dates back to May 2016 when Aderinto co-organized a conference on Lagos with Abosede George and Ademide Adelusi-Adeluyi at Barnard College, New York City. Participants at the conference noted the significance of having an organization to harmonize the works of academic and non-academic practitioners of Lagos. They suggested the formation of the LSA. In spring of 2017, Aderinto led the establishment of the LSA as "an international, interdisciplinary organization of academic and non-academic practitioners whose interest focus on Lagos and its peoples." The LSA organizes the annual Lagos Conference held in Lagos (Nigeria) and holds panels at international conferences of the African Studies Association of the United States and the African Studies Association of the United Kingdom.

== Books ==
Aderinto has published eight books, thirty-six journal articles and book chapters, forty encyclopedia articles, and twenty book reviews.

- Aderinto, Saheed (2022). Animality and Colonial Subjecthood in Africa: The Human and Nonhuman Creatures of Nigeria. Ohio University Press. ISBN 978-0-8214-4768-0.
- Gennaro, Michael J.; Aderinto, Saheed (2019). Sports in African History, Politics, and Identity Formation. Routledge. ISBN 978-0-429-66855-5.
- Aderinto, Saheed (2018). Guns and Society in Colonial Nigeria: Firearms, Culture, and Public Order. Indiana University Press. ISBN 9780253031600.
- Aderinto, Saheed (2018). Guns and Society in Colonial Nigeria. Indiana University Press. doi:10.2307/j.ctt2204p6x. ISBN 978-0-253-03162-4.
- Aderinto, Saheed (2017). African Kingdoms: An Encyclopedia of Empires and Civilizations. Santa Barbara, CA: Bloomsbury Publishing USA. ISBN 978-1-61069-580-0.
- Aderinto, Saheed (2015). Children and Childhood in Colonial Nigerian Histories. Springer. ISBN 978-1-137-49293-7.
- Aderinto, Saheed (2014). When Sex Threatened the State. University of Illinois Press. doi:10.5406/illinois/9780252038884.001.0001. ISBN 978-0-252-03888-4.
- Aderinto, Saheed; Osifodunrin, Paul (2013). The Third Wave of Historical Scholarship on Nigeria: Essays in Honor of Ayodeji Olukoju. Cambridge Scholars Publishing. ISBN 978-1-4438-4712-4.
- Nigeria, Nationalism, and Writing History (University of Rochester Press, 2010), co-authored 1580463584.

== Notable journal articles ==
- Aderinto, Saheed (2018). "Empire Day in Africa: Patriotic Colonial Childhood, Imperial Spectacle and Nationalism in Nigeria, 1905–60". The Journal of Imperial and Commonwealth History. 46 (4): 731–757. doi:10.1080/03086534.2018.1452538. ISSN 0308-6534.
- Aderinto, Saheed (2015). "Journey to Work: Transnational Prostitution in Colonial British West Africa". Journal of the History of Sexuality. 24 (1): 99–124. doi:10.7560/jhs24105. ISSN 1043-4070.
- Aderinto, Saheed (2015). ""O! Sir I do not know either to kill myself or to stay": Childhood Emotion, Poverty, and Literary Culture in Nigeria, 1900–1960". The Journal of the History of Childhood and Youth. 8 (2): 273–294. doi:10.1353/hcy.2015.0024. ISSN 1941-3599.
- Aderinto, Saheed (2013). "Where Is the Boundary?: Cocoa Conflict, Land Tenure, and Politics in Western Nigeria, 1890s-1960". Journal of Social History. 47 (1): 176–195. doi:10.1093/jsh/sht054. ISSN 0022-4529.
- Aderinto, Saheed (2012). ""The problem of Nigeria is slavery, not white slave traffic": Globalization and the politicization of prostitution in Southern Nigeria, 1921–1955". Canadian Journal of African Studies. 46 (1): 1–22. doi:10.1080/00083968.2012.659576. ISSN 0008-3968.
- Aderinto, Saheed (2012). "Of Gender, Race, and Class: The Politics of Prostitution in Lagos, Nigeria, 1923–1954". Frontiers: A Journal of Women Studies. 33 (3): 71–92. doi:10.1353/fro.2012.a491661. ISSN 1536-0334.
- Aderinto, Saheed (2012). "Dangerous Aphrodisiac, Restless Sexuality: Venereal disease, biomedicine, and protectionism in colonial Lagos, Nigeria". Journal of Colonialism and Colonial History. 13 (3). doi:10.1353/cch.2012.0043. ISSN 1532-5768.
