= Obesere =

Nigerian musician

Abass Akande
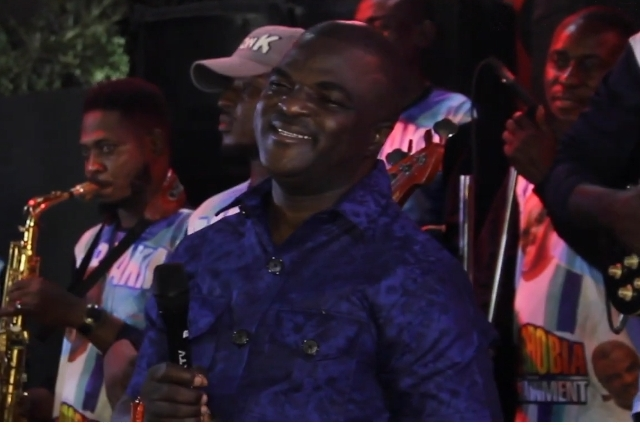

Background information
- Also known as: Omo Rapala, Papa Tosibe, Sidophobia, Oba Alasakasa, Omo Idan
- Born: Abass Akande; 20 January 1965 (age 61); Ibadan, Oyo State, Nigeria
- Genres: Fuji; pop; hip hop
- Occupation: Singer-songwriter
- Instrument: Vocals
- Years active: 1981–present
- Labels: Freeworld Music; Mayors Veil Entertainment; Sony Music; Bayowa Records

Abass Akande Obesere // (born 20 January 1965), also known by his stage name Omo Rapala, is a Nigerian artist, singer and record producer who is a native of Ibadan, the largest city in Western Nigeria. A popular Fuji musician, Obesere forced his way into the limelight through his unusual music style and slang usage. Following the paths of other successful musicians such as Sikiru Ayinde Barrister, Obesere has taken his own brand of Fuji music all over the world. He was initially signed with Sony Music but moved on to other labels after payment disputes. For most of his musical career, he had a long-time rivalry with K1 De Ultimate, another popular Fuji musician.

Obesere is currently signed with Mayors Ville Entertainment artist management firm, a subsidiary of Maxgolan Entertainment Group, a record company in Lagos, Nigeria.

== Controversies ==
Obesere was accused of raping Olaiya Olanike on the 12 of February 2013 in his Okota, Lagos home, an allegation Obesere has since denied.

== Discography ==
=== Albums ===
- Introduction (1992 Marvin Giwa Record)
- Mr. Magic (1992 Marvin Giwa Record)
- Asakasa (Sony 1993)
- O.B.T.K. (Sony 1995)
- Compilation Tawakalitu Record 1995)
- Diplomacy 1996
- live in Europe 1996
- Mr. Teacher (Sony 1997)
- Oodua 1998)
- Elegance 1999
- Omorapala Overthrow (Dudu Heritage 2000)
- American Faaji Series 1&2 (Dudu Heritage)
- His Excellency (Bayowa 2002)
- Egungun Be Careful (Bayowa 2004)
- Papa worldwide (Bayowa 2004)
- Old Skool Lape (Bayowa)
- Apple Juice (Bayowa)
- Okokoriko (Bayowa)
- Obaadan (Bayowa)
- Effissy (Corporate Pictures)
- Confirmation (Corporate Pictures)
- New Face
- Jaforie
- Alaimore (Ingrate)

==== Singles ====
- "Egungun Be Careful"
- "Baby Mi sexy"
- "Murderer"
- "EKO"
- "Paraga" (ft. Fayrous)
- "Ebelesua" (ft. Olamide)
- "Mobinu tan"
- "Emi ni"
- "Basira"
- "Slow Slow" (Remix)
- "Ja Fo rie" (ft. Reminisce)
- "Ibi ni ma kusi" (ft. Mz Kizz)
- "Ki nan so" (ft. 9ice)
- "Obesere tilo"
- "Alhaji" (ft. Seriki)
- "Ki nan so" (ft. 9ice) (Remix)
- "Baby mi" (ft. 2star)
- "Wind E"
- "E ma le won"
- "GBO se yen so"
- "Asakasa"
- "O.B.T.K."
- "Mr Teacher"
- "Ileke Idi"
- "Omo iku"
- "Mr Teacher part II"
- "Baba Baba Tide"
- "Amin ase"
- "Ibaje"

== Personal life ==
Obesere is married to Abeni Tolanikawo and the marriage is blessed with Children.

== See also ==
- List of Nigerian musicians
