= Barry Jhay =

Nigerian Afrobeats musician

- Born: Oluwakayode Junior Abdul-Qudus Balogun; 13 February 1997 (age 29); Surulere, Lagos State, Nigeria
- Genres: Afrobeats; Afrobeat
- Occupation: Musician
- Years active: 2018–present
- Label: BANG HITS MUSIC

Oluwakayode Junior Abdul-Qudus Balogun (born 13 February 1997), famously known as Barry Jhay, is a Nigerian Afrobeats Musician, most known for his cultural music style. He was born in Surulere, Lagos, Nigeria where he was raised. Barry was born into a lineage of well-known Yoruba musicians as his grandfather I.K. Dairo is a well-known Juju traditional artist and father Sikiru Ololade Ayinde Barrister is credited for the invention of Fuji music. His upbringing in a musically rich environment influenced his unique Afro-Fuji Pop style, blending traditional Fuji elements with contemporary Afrobeat sounds.

== Early life ==
Given his musical lineage, Barry Jhay took interest in music from a very young age. He started recording music at the young age of 5 years. He has attributed watching his father's performances to his inspiration to make music.

== Debut ==
In 2018 he released his hit single “Aiye” giving him the popularity he needed to pursue his career in music. The song captured representation of the cyclical nature of life. Following his famous record, he released his first studio album "Barry Back" in 2020. This album featured hit songs such as “Ashe She” and “Ma So Pe”. This album also featured award winning Nigerian musician Davido. Soon after his album release Barry Jhay signed a record deal with Cash Nation Entertainment. As he rose to fame, he was able to record songs with other famous musicians such as Bad Boy Timz, Rhaman Jago, Lyta, and Jawton. With his debut, Barry Jhay won a City People Music Award for Best New Act and the Rookie of the Year award at The Headies in 2019.

== Music and career ==
Barry is a musician as well as a sound engineer. His music has explored profound themes such as the Yoruba concept of Ori and has conveyed other messages such as urging listeners to be more compassionate and to be courageous in the face of oppression and to examine evidence before passing judgment. His hit song "Aiye" was said to be the "bringing back of the Yoruba quality sound and culture". His belief is that music is for one's soul, and he has portrayed his intention to make music that has deeper meaning and is particularly his, as opposed to the result of his musical lineage. He believes music should provide solace and reflection, addressing deeper life challenges beyond just entertainment. Barry views music as nourishment for the soul, aiming to create timeless and meaningful pieces.

== Awards and nominations ==
Year	Award ceremony	Prize	Recipient	Result	Ref
2018	City People Music Awards	Best New Act of the Year	Himself	Won	
2018	City People Music Awards	Most Promising Act of the Year	Himself	Nominated	
2019	The Headies	Rookie of the Year	Himself	Won	

== Discography ==
=== Singles ===
- "Ashe She"
- "Only You"
- "Olodo"
- "Sokale"
- "Ori"
- "Japa"
- "Muje"
- "Solemuje"
- "Aiye"
- "Kabiyesi"
- "Eleduwa" (2024)
- "Lost" (2025)
- "Buga Won" (2025)
- "Peace (II)" (2025)
- "Steady" (2026)
- "Fuji Explosion" (2026)

=== Albums and EPs ===
- Barry Back (2020)
- Son of God (EP, 2022)
- Party Boy Barry (EP, 2023)
- Barry Back 2 (EP, 2023)
- Barrystar Vol. 1 (2025)
- Barrystar Vol. 1 (Deluxe) (2025)
- Steady x Fuji Explosion (EP, 2026)
