= KS1 Malaika =

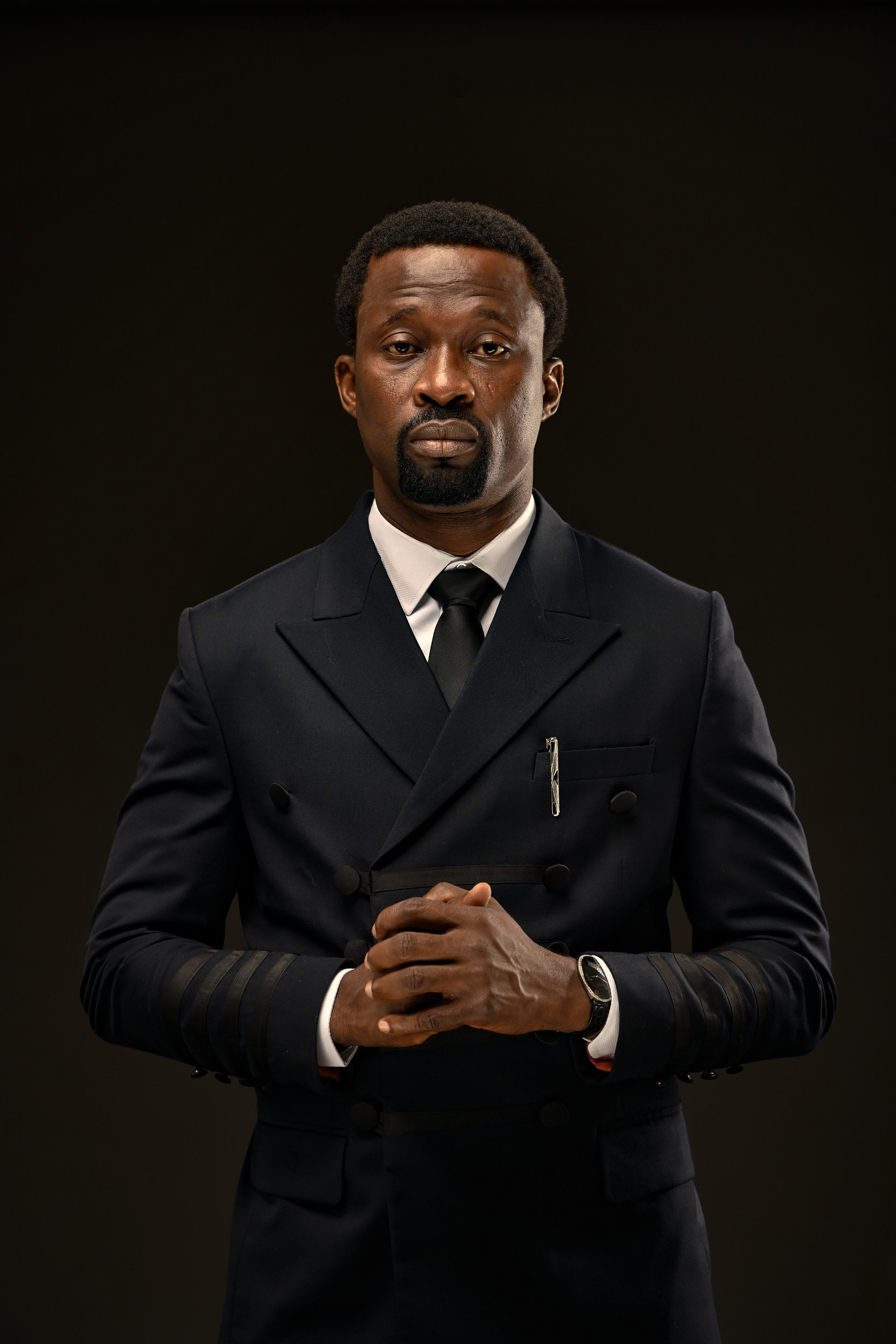

Background information
- Also known as: KS 1 De Pride, Alayeluwa, Mandiba, CNN Alhaji, Ike Anobi, Seriki, Jagaban, Imeku Alhaji, Malaika
- Born: Sulaimon Alao Adekunle; 15 February 1973 (age 53); Lagos, Nigeria
- Origin: Ogun State
- Genres: Fuji
- Occupations: Songwriter, singer, performer
- Instruments: Vocals, guitar, Keyboard, Talking drums, Percussion
- Years active: 1983–present
- Label: Babalaje Music

Sulaimon Alao Adekunle (born 15 February 1973), commonly known by his stage name KS1 Malaika, is a Nigerian Fuji musician.

== Early life ==
Sulaimon Alao Adekunle was born on 15 February 1973. He attended Oyewo;e Primary School and Yewa High School. He started performing music from an early age in a Quranic school in Agege, a suburb of Lagos. His early career included playing Were, the early morning Islamic wake up music during the Ramadan season. He formed his first Fuji band in 1983.

With his band Tekoye Fuji Organization, he performed in the United States from November 1997, touring about 15 states before returning to Nigeria.

== Music career ==
KS1 Malaika has collaborated with various artistes in different genres of music, including Islamic and gospel musicians, and his music has been sampled by other Fuji and hip-hop artists. Malaika composes, arranges and produces his own music. His music incorporates traditional African and Nigerian instruments such as the Gangan, Iya ilu, Bata, Sakara, Agogô, assorted percussions, Guitar, Hawaiian guitar, Keyboard and Saxophone.

== Personal life ==
Sulaimon Alao is married to Olubukonla Saliu Adekunle, the daughter of Saliu Adetunji, the 41st Olubadan of Ibadan.

== Endorsement ==
- Tecno Mobile

== Discography ==
=== Albums ===
- Mr Wonder (1994)
- Masterpiece (1995)
- Legend (1996)
- Malaika (1997)
- American Dream (1998)
- Correction (1999)
- Recompense (2000)
- CNN (2002)
- Unstoppable (2003)
- Interlink (2003)
- Peace Maker (2004)
- Alayeluwa (2005)
- European Knockout (2006)
- Dedication (2007)
- Elevator and Motivator (2009)
- Africa Like Europe (2010)
- Proper Music (2011)
- Special day (2012)
- Superstar (2014)
- Original (2016)
- Golden Jubilee (2017)
- Example (2019)
- Original (2020)
- Password (2022)
- Grace (2023)
- Focus (2025)

== Awards and nominations ==
Year	Award ceremony	Award description	Result	Ref
2015	City People Awards	Best Fuji Musician of the Year	Nominated	
2015	Nigeria Achievers Awards	Best Fuji Artiste of the Year	Won	
2016	Islamic Music and Associated Nominees Awards	Best Collaboration Album of the Year	Won	
2015	Yoruba Music and Films Awards	Best Fuji Artiste of the Year	Won	
