= Olabisi Ajala =

Nigerian journalist, travel writer

Background information
- Also known as: Ajala the traveller
- Born: Moshood Adisa Olabisi Ajala; April 3, 1934; Ghana
- Origin: Lagos, Nigeria
- Died: February 2, 1999 (aged 64) Health facility, Lagos, Nigeria
- Occupations: Journalist, Travel Writer
- Years active: 1957-1999

Moshood Adisa Olabisi Ajala, also known as Ọlábísí Àjàlá, was a Nigerian journalist, travel writer, actor, and socialite. Between 1957 and 1962, Àjàlá trekked across Asia, Africa and Oceania on a Vespa scooter, publishing an account of his experiences as An African Abroad in 1963. To this day, Àjàlá remains a significant figure within Nigerian popular culture, with songs and sayings commemorating his adventurous travel across the world.

== Early life and education ==
Olabisi Ajala was born in Ghana in either 1929 or 1934 to a Nigerian family. It was a polygamous family, with about thirty children and four wives. Olabisi was the twenty-fifth. When he was a child, his family moved to Nigeria. There he attended Baptist Academy in Lagos and Ibadan Boys’ High School in Ibadan.

At the age of eighteen, In 1952, he moved to the United States to study pre-medicine at DePaul University. There, he was the first black student in the Delta Upsilon Pi ‘fratority’, a co-educational Greek-letter organization. He later moved to Roosevelt University (then called "Roosevelt College") to study Psychology.

== Travel in the United States ==
In Chicago, Àjàlá decided to make a cross-country trip from Chicago to Los Angeles on a bicycle. Departing on the 12th June 1952, he arrived in Los Angeles only twenty-eight days later. The trip earned him many accolades, including coverage in the major newspapers. Upon his arrival in Los Angeles, Àjàlá was received by Mayor Fletcher Bowron.

Àjàlá then briefly became an actor. He was cast in White Witch Doctor, a film based on the 1950 novel of the same name by Louise A. Stinetorf. According to Àjàlá, he found out about the part through a social connection to Ronald Reagan, whom he had met three years earlier. He was also signed up to act in the 1953 film Killer Ape but never started work on it.

Later that year, after a number of run-ins with the American immigration for petty offenses including issuing false checks, Àjàlá was sentenced to one-year suspended jail term. He had also abandoned his school work—he had supposedly transferred to Santa Monica Junior College but was not keeping up with his studies—and was ordered to be deported to Nigeria. Àjàlá protested the deportation order, claiming that he would be executed by his father. In protest, he climbed on an 80-foot radio tower, threatening to kill himself unless the order was rescinded. After nearly 13 hours, he jumped down from about fifteen feet and sustained a sprained back. He then began a hunger strike, which he termed a 30-day Ramadan fasting. Eventually, he was deported to London.

In December 1954, Àjàlá returned to the United States. He settled in Chicago with his wife Hermine Aileen, a New York model, although the pair divorced in 1955 on grounds of philandering and adultery which Àjàlá he did not contest. In December 1955, he remarried again, this time to a 19-year-old British actress named Joan Simons.

== World tour and An African Abroad ==
On April 27, 1957, Àjàlá began his famous world tour on a modified Vespa scooter. He visited India, the Soviet Union, the United Arab Republic, Iran, Jordan, Israel, Palestine, Poland, Germany, Czechoslovakia, Austria, Yugoslavia, Albania, Bulgaria, Romania, Hungary, Türkiye, Hong Kong, China and Australia. The journey attracted the attention of several world leaders, and Àjàlá met and conducted short interviews with Jawaharlal Nehru, Golda Meir, Abubakar Tafawa Balewa, Gamal Abdel Nasser, The Shah of Iran, and Nikita Khrushchev.

During this period, Àjàlá made money as a journalist. Over the course of his travels, he sold travel writing to newspapers and magazines across West Africa. In Papua New Guinea, he also published stories on local politics in The Canberra Times. Àjàlá also had a brief career as a radio broadcaster. In 1960, he claims to have signed a contract with the Israeli state broadcaster Kol Yisrael to produce programmes for their broadcasts to West Africa. However, he broke this contract to move to the United Arab Republic, where he appeared as a guest announcer on Radio Cairo's African service. His broadcasts from Cairo were consistently anti-Israeli, warning listeners about the nation's "continuous propaganda against the Arab countries" and its mistreatment of Mizrahi Jews.

He also suffered encounters with law enforcement. In the Soviet Union, he was accused of trying to assassinate Nikita Khrushchev because he had walked too close to him at a public event. He was also arrested at Jerusalem's Mandelbaum Gate, at that time the border between Israel and Jordan, where he was almost shot by Jordanian security forces for speeding across without permission.

In 1963, Àjàlá published an account of these travels titled An African Abroad. The book expresses opinions on how people lived in the places he visited, explains the political situation in many of the countries he visited, and shares anecdotes about the various world leaders he met.

== Return to Nigeria ==
Afterwards, Àjàlá returned to Nigeria, where he became a famous socialite. He also became an entertainment promoter and publicist, who worked with artists like Sikiru Ayinde Barrister.

He was also praised in songs - notably by Ebenezer Obey, who wrote about Àjàlá with the words "You have travelled all over the world. Àjàlá travelled all over the world...". From then on, the words "Àjàlá travels" became synonymous with wanderlust and extensive traveling.

In Nigeria, he married Alhaja Ṣadé, and was reputed to have children by a few other women.

== Death and legacy ==
While living in Lagos, Àjàlá suffered a stroke in the early days of 1999. He died on February 2, 1999.

To this day, Àjàlá is known today as Nigeria's most famous traveller. His name is equated to travel and adventure and his children continue to live in many parts of the world. His autobiography, An African Abroad, was republished by OlongoAfrica in 2022.
