= Saheed Osupa =

Nigerian musical artist (born 1969)

- Also known as: King of Fuji, Olufimo, Matagbamole
- Born: Saheed Akorede Babatunde Okunola; 7 August 1969 (age 57); Ajegunle, Lagos, Lagos State, Nigeria
- Origin: Ibadan (Ayeye)
- Genres: Fuji, hip hop
- Occupation: Singer-songwriter
- Instrument: Vocals
- Years active: 1983–present

Saheed Akorede Babatunde Okunola // (born 7 August 1969), also known by the stage names Saheed Osupa or King Saheed Osupa (K.S.O.), is a Nigerian Fuji, musician, film actor, and hip Fuji creator.

== Personal life ==
Saheed osupa is a family man, who has a huge family. He is married to two wives, whose names are Azeezat and Olabisi Muinat and also have a total of 8 children- six- sons and two daughters.

== Early life ==
Saheed Osupa was born in the Mosafejo area of Ajegunle, Lagos State but grew up in Ibadan, the capital of Oyo State. His father, Moshood Ajiwere Layeye, was a Wéré music artist and also an elder cousin of Fuji musician Ayinde Barrister.

== Education ==
Osupa went to Amuwo Odofin High School in Lagos, and graduated in 1987. In 1992, he completed his National Diploma programme at The Polytechnic, Ibadan after studying Business Administration. He is an alumnus of the American International College, where he studied Networking Operations.

== Career ==
=== Fuji music ===
Osupa started music professionally as a teenager in 1983 as a Fuji artiste. His first album was titled Fuji Fa Disco, followed by Fuji Blues. He has released over 40 studio albums, including a 4-in-1 studio album titled Mr. Music. In 2008, Osupa was declared the "King of Fuji Music" by Ayinde Barrister.

=== Hip hop music ===
On 20 December 2014, Osupa released a hip hop single titled "Vanakula" produced by K-Solo. On 13 April 2015, he released another K-Solo-produced single titled "African Beauty" with vocals from Yetunde Omobadan. On 8 August 2015, he featured Seriki in another single titled "Womi".

On 7 November 2015, Osupa was listed among The NET's "Most Successful Nigerian musicians".

On 12 June 2018, Osupa released his first hip Fuji album, Non-Stop.

=== Acting ===
- Osupa has appeared in over 30 Yoruba films. Some of the popular films that featured him include
- Eni eleni
- Ese mefa laye
- Ero sese koowe
- Ose maami

== Rivalry with Wasiu Alabi Pasuma ==
Osupa and Wasiu Alabi Pasuma have had a rivalry. Osupa released about 10 records addressing their feud. The feud continued into 2012. Osupa claimed that several fruitless peace meetings took place in 2010 and 2011.

== Discography ==
=== Selected singles ===
As lead artist
Year	Title	Album
2014	"Vanakula"	TBA
2015	"African Beauty" (Yetunde Omobadan)	TBA
2015	"Womi" (Seriki)	TBA
2018	"Labodan" (Temitope Kush)	TBA
2018	"Abeke"	TBA
	"Awon Temi" Ft Temitope Kush	TBA

==== Studio albums ====
- Fuji Fadisco
- Fuji Blues
- Fuji Demonstration
- Master Blaster
- Stainless Fuji
- Fuji Boggie
- Unbeatable
- Shuffle Solo
- Ovation
- Scores
- Hot Shot
- Advice
- New Edition (Shuffle Solo 11)
- Authentic
- Big Daddy
- Champion
- London Delight under Marvin Giwa Promotion
- African Delight
- American Fuji Slide
- World Tour
- London Extra
- Respect and Reliable - 2 in 1
- Fuji Icon
- Endorsement - 3 in 1
- Mr. Music - 4 in 1
- Marriage Affair
- Barrybration
- Euro Splash
- Time Factor
- Impact
- Turn By Turn
- The Main Man
- Capability
- Tested and Trusted - 2 in 1
- Guaranteed
- Lord of Music - 2 in 1
- Transparency and Transformation - 2 in 1
- New Dawn - 2 in 1
- New resolution
- Pacesetter 2017
- Non-Stop 2018
- Dynamism (13 August 2018)
- C Caution 2019
- Integrity (07/08/2019)
- Permutation (23 December 2019)
- Special request-2 nd 1 (05/07/2020)
- Eni Olohun (2020)
- Permutation(2020)
- Special Request (2020)
- What Next (2020)
- Diary (2021)
- Direction(2021)
- Power of Music (2022)
- Fuji Template (2022)
- Phenomenon (2023)
- Everlasting And Oracle (2024)
- GODSENT (Album, 2024)
- Oracle (Album, 2024)
- Everlasting (Album, 2024)
- Acapella & Metamorphosis (Album, 2026)
- New resolution (2017)

== Selected filmography ==
- Eni Eleni
- Ero Sese Koowe
- Ese Mefa Laye
- Ose Maami
- Ashiru Ejire
- Onibara Ogunjo
- Iku Oba
- Igba Iwase
- Agbeere Oju
- Alukoro
- Aroba (Fable)
- Osoro baba ojo
- Oloju ede
- Adigun olori odo
- Onimoto
- Olokiki Oru 1, 2 & 3

== Awards and nominations ==
Year	Award ceremony	Prize	Result
2013	FIBAN Awards	Best Fuji Artist	Nominated
2013	Yoruba Academy Awards	Best Musician in an Acting Role	Won
2015	City People Entertainment Awards	Best Fuji Musician of the Year	Won
2015	Nigerian Achievers Award 2015	Best Fuji Music Artist	Nominated
2019	The Yoruba Image International Awards	Best Fuji Musician of the Year	Won
