= Kola Ogunkoya =

Nigerian musician

- Born: 20 August 1967 (age 58); Owerri, Imo State, Nigeria
- Occupation: Musician

Kola Ogunkoya (born 20 August 1967) is a Nigerian afrobeat musician who uses the term "Afro Gbedu" to describe his style of music, which includes jazz, highlife, Jùjú, funk and traditional Yoruba music.

== Biography ==
Kola was born on 20 August in Owerri, Imo State, Nigeria, but was of Yoruba background, the son of an itinerant police officer. After moving from Iboland to Lagos, he attended Okota Community High School, a tough environment. He was a successful amateur boxer as a teenager, but due to opposition to his pursuing this career from his father turned to music, singing and playing trumpet in his local church. He now plays an array of instruments including saxophone - soprano, alto, tenor and baritone, trumpet, flugel horn, and slide trombone.

He was influenced by artists such as Fela Anikulapo-Kuti, Orlando Julius, Dr Victor Abimbola Olaiya, Dayo Kujore and King Sunny Adé, and for two years played with Olaiya. At age 18 he formed his own band in Lagos. Kola and his 15-piece Afro jazz Ensemble, which includes female dancers, has performed all over the globe. He went to USA in 1996 where he had a successful tour. On return to Nigeria he opened a cultural club for Art and Music in Opebi, Allen, Lagos. He lost his investment to a corrupt businessman, and his brother was murdered in front of the club. Due to these experiences he returned to the US, where he gained citizenship. By 2010 he had recorded 8 CDs.

== Discography ==
- Na jeje ooo (1990)
- Kola Ogunkoya - Loud
- Pan Pan Robo Robo
- Kola Omo Baba Olopa
