= Qdot =

Nigerian musician and songwriter

Background information
- Also known as: Qdot, Qdot Alagbe
- Born: Qudus Fakoya Oluwadamilare
- Genres: Afrobeats, Hip-hop, Yoruba music
- Occupations: Singer, songwriter
- Years active: 2012—present
- Label: Yorubadboi Music

Qudus Fakoya Oluwadamilare (born April 30, 1988 in Ikorodu, Lagos State, Nigeria), also known as Qdot, is a Nigerian singer and songwriter. He is known for his songs Alomo Meta, Gbese, and Emilokan. He is the CEO of Yorubadboi Music record label, winner of the 2019 Best Indigenous Artiste Award, and cultural ambassador for Yoruba culture.

== Early life and education ==
Qdot is the first born of a Muslim father and second born of a Christian mother. Qdot was raised by his paternal grandmother Moriamo Alege in Abule Ado near Shagamu, Ogun State. Until his teens, he was under the impression that his grandmother was his biological mother. Qdot frequently expresses his deep connection and gratitude for his upbringing to his late grandmother through his music and started introducing himself as "Omo'mo Moriamo" at the beginning of his songs which translates to "The grandchild of Moriamo".

Qdot obtained his SSCE certificate from United Secondary School and obtained his post secondary school certificate from Yaba College of Technology where he studied General Arts. In 2023, Qdot enrolled in a masters degree program at the University of Hertfordshire in England.

== Career ==
=== 2012–2017: Early career, growing popularity, and first collaborations ===
Qdot began his musical career when he was in elementary school and won several talent hunts. He started releasing music professionally in 2012. One of his first releases was Fuel Subsidy, followed by The Story, and Afarawe, all typical Nigerian life stories reflecting on growing up in poverty and fighting for daily survival.

Qdot shooting the music video for his song Ibadan in 2014

For his 2013 released song Alomo Meta, Qdot incorporated street drinks and slangs into the lyrics, providing an insight of how everyday street life looks like. As his first song to reach thousands of people, Alomo Meta is considered his first Nigerian street anthem.

In 2014, Qdot created a freestyle about the city Ibadan. The Yoruba rapper Olamide heard the song and decided to add a verse to it. In Ibadan, Qdot sings fondly about the ancient city with new interpretations for old metaphors while Olamide's rap verse pays homage to the city's nightlife, comparing it to Lagos. Well-perceived by his audience was also the in 2016 released single La La Lu featuring another Yoruba lyricist, Lil Kesh.

With his in 2017 released song Apala New School, Qdot demonstrated his versatility adapting various different Yoruba music subgenres while adding his own twist, narrating of Nigeria's 2016 recession in a humorous way.

Equally successful was the release of Ijo Gelede in 2017, a high-energy track which refers to the traditional Yoruba festival honouring female ancestors, deities, and mothers, blending modern Afrosounds with cultural percussion.

=== 2018–2020: Breakthrough with Gbese and uptempo releases ===
In late 2018, Qdot released the single Gbese. The uptempo song combined modern Afrobeats and Street-Hop with traditional Fuji music into a new vibe. Qdot also applied the concept of mixing old and new to his lyrics by leaning on Haruna Ishola's song Ina Ran on the one side while singing about legwork on the other side, infusing his humour into the storyline. The song quickly amassed millions of streams across all streaming platforms and became one of the most played songs of the year on the streets of Nigeria.

Qdot performing at Agege stadium in 2020

With Koshi Danu, he released another quick tempo record that tells the story of Kalimot, the suspicious caller, who steals a phone with its charger in 2019. The song carries a lot of rap influences with heavy punchlines and quotables.

The release of Jaiye beginning of 2020 continued Qdot's string of danceable songs that resonated well with his audience. In the song, the singer thanks God for the success of the previous years and prays for more blessings so he can enjoy his money while he is still alive.

Similar as in Koshi Danu, Qdot applied his witty songwriting to the later in 2020 released single Ah!, where his lyrics sound like a neighbourhood watchman who is aware of everything happening around him in a close-knit community.

After his breakthrough, Qdot started to regularly perform outside of Nigeria, namely Germany, Ireland, England, Egypt, Qatar, and Dubai.

=== 2020–2021: First studio album Alagbe the Album ===
Qdot released his first studio album titled Alagbe the Album on November 20, 2020. The album consisted of 17 tracks and featured Patoranking, Zlatan, 9ice, Niniola, Pasuma, T Classic, Jaywon, Pepenazi, and XSmile.

=== 2022–2023: EP Orin Dafidi (Psalms) and Emi Lo Kan ===
On March 13, 2022, Qdot released his EP titled Orin Dafidi (Psalms). The six-track-project contained collaborations with Davido, Simi, Vector, Terry Apala, Small Doctor, Chinko Ekun, Seriki, Debbie, and D-Dolla.

Following an online trending presidential campaign speech by Bola Ahmed Tinubu, Qdot incorporated the Yoruba slogan "Emi lo kan", which translates to "It is my turn", into his musical storytelling. The mid-tempo track Emi Lo Kan was released in June 2022 and marked another successful record in Qdot's career.

=== 2024–present: Second studio album BRB the Album ===
Qdot's second studio album titled BRB the Album was released on June 12, 2024. The album consisted of 16 tracks and featured Bella Shmurda, Reekado Banks, L.A.X., Ntosh Gazi, Bad Boy Timz, Harry Aye, and Starlekzy.

== Artistry ==
According to Nigerian pop culture commentator and journalist Motolani Alake, "Qdot is one of the most unique Nigerian artists", characterising his style as "dynamic, elusive, ubiquitous and impeccable" and his voice as cut straight from the depth of Yoruba music subgenres like Fuji, Apala, and local pop while sharing a similar vocal texture with Rara and Ijala singers but also sounding like an Alagbe, a Yoruba praise singer. Qdot himself furthermore mentions the white garment church way of worshipping as influential to his way of singing.

When it comes to his songwriting, Qdot blends in-depth Yoruba language, sayings, and proverbs into Nigerian street lingo. The storytelling of his music evolves around everyday situations, shared experiences, and social concerns of the average Nigerian, including dating and internet fraud culture, party drugs, and vices, his own upbringing, journey, and perception of life, love and family, gratitude and respect. Qdot's listeners appreciate his ability to observe the streets and relay his perception with spot-on descriptions, either unbiasedly, infusing his humour, or cautioning, but always from a place of affection and in a non-judgmental manner.

== Personal life ==
Known for being family-oriented, Qdot has publicly and constantly shown care and respect for his parents and cultural heritage.

On September 28, 2025, Qdot was attacked and robbed at gunpoint in his house in Lagos. The armed robbers escaped with his phones and laptops, and retrieved all funds from his bank accounts.

== Discography ==
Albums

- Alagbe the Album (2020)
- BRB the Album (2024)

EPs

- Orin Dafidi (Psalms) (2022)

Singles

- Fuel Subsidy (2012)
- The Story (2012)
- Afarawe (2012)
- Orin Emi / Alomo Meta (2013)
- Ibadan featuring Olamide (2014)
- Orijin (2014)
- Alhaji (2015)
- Turn Up (2016)
- La La Lu featuring Lil Kesh (2016)
- Apala New School (2017)
- Ijo Gelede (2017)
- Gbese (2018)
- Koshi Danu (2019)
- Jaiye (2020)
- German (2020)
- Ah! (2020)
- Jegele (2020)
- Ole (2021)
- Emi Lo Kan (2022)
- Alhamdulillah (2023)
- Amin (2025)
- 28 of Sept (2026)
- Adabi (2026)

Featurings

- 2TBoyz – Parte After Parte (2019)
- Oyin – Ife (2021)
- DJ OP Dot – Gbemidebe (2022)
- Kabex – God Abeg (2022)
- Oritse Femi – Elele (2023)
- DJ YK Mule – Oblee (2024)
- Danny S – Omo Lile Refix (2025)
- HypemanDjPablo – Ace Refix (2025)
