= Sakara drum =

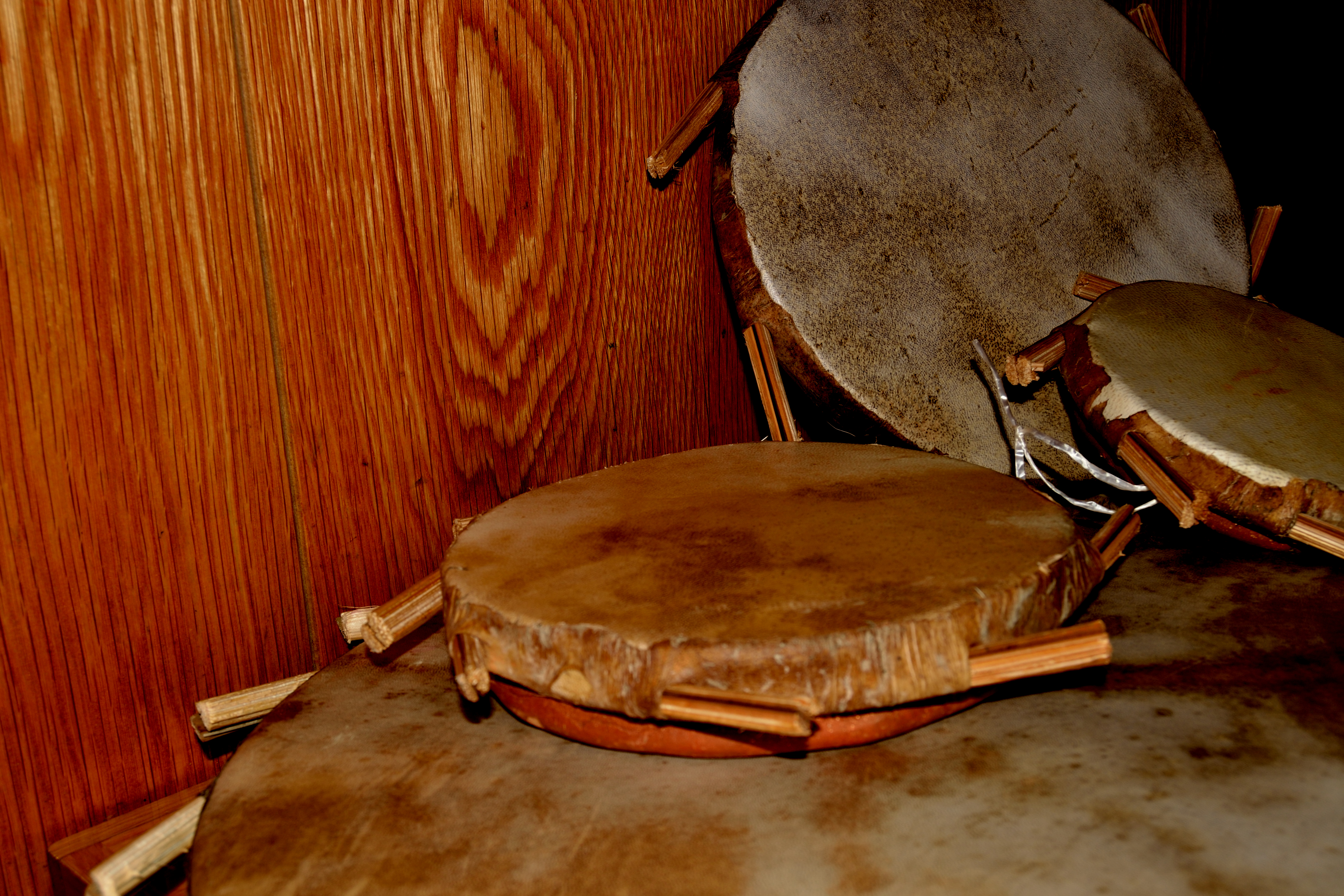
- A traditional Sakara drum

Percussion instrument
- Classification: Membranophone

Related instruments
- Dundun (talking drum), Batá drum, Gbedu

The Sakara drum is a shallow membranophone with a circular body made of baked clay. It is one of the four major families of Yoruba drums of Nigeria, alongside the Dundun/Gangan (talking drum), the Batá drum, and the Gbedu drum. The Sakara is also crafted and used by the Hausa people of northern Nigeria.

== Construction and playing ==
The Sakara is typically built with a shallow clay shell that is perhaps ten inches in diameter and one and a half inches deep, sloping inward funnel-wise towards the back. The drumhead is traditionally made from goat skin, though the largest drums may use cow or antelope skin. This skin is secured to the baked clay shell with twine and tuned using pegs spaced around its body.

When played, the drummer hits the face of the drum with a stick while using the fingers of the other hand to alter the tone of the instrument. Sakara drums are played in ensembles, with each family including drums of different sizes. When played together, the mother drum (iya ilu) plays the lead role, dictating the pace and rhythmic style. The fixed-pitch omele ako and omele abo drums provide rhythmic support, and the smaller, higher-toned omele "chord" drum adds flavor by playing varied pitches.

== Cultural significance and musical styles ==
The Yoruba have traditionally used Sakara drums for a variety of cultural and religious purposes, such as during Yoruba wedding ceremonies. Historically, Wéré music was played using Sakara drums to call Muslims to feast and prayer during the holy month of Ramadan. Fuji music, a popular Nigerian musical genre, grew out of this Wéré musical form.

The instrument is also a core component of Sakara music, a genre popularized by artists like Yusuf Olatunji. In Sakara music, the rhythm of the Sakara drum is often paired with the solemn-sounding Goje (a traditional spike fiddle). This style overlays the nasalized, melismatic vocals of Islamic music traditions onto the indigenous percussion accompaniment.
