= Wasiu Alabi Pasuma =

Nigerian fuji musician (born 1967)

- Born: Wasiu Alabi Ajibola Odetola; 27 November 1967 (age 58); Mushin, Lagos State, Nigeria
- Other names: Ajibola, Pasuma Wonder, Oganla, Bawasi, Lagata, Ijoba Fuji, Sheu Fuji, Gauzu Fuji, Aljannah Fuji
- Citizenship: Nigeria, Georgia, USA
- Occupations: Actor; Fuji musician Hip-hop musician
- Children: 10

Wasiu Alabi Odetola // (Pasuma) (born 27 November 1967), also known as "Oganla", "Pasuma Wonder", "Bawasi" is a Nigerian actor and Fuji musician.

== Early life ==
He was born on 27 November 1967 and is originally from Edunabon, Ife North Local Government in Osun State, and spent his childhood and part of his early adulthood in Mushin, Lagos State.

He was raised by his mother, Alhaja Adijat Kubura Odetola, also known as Iyawo Anobi, whom he frequently acknowledges in his music as a significant source of support. He attended Muslim Mission Primary school and later proceeded to Nigerian Model High School, Mushin, Lagos for his secondary education.

== Career ==
Pasuma began writing songs in 1984, drawing inspiration from his role model K1 De Ultimate, who released the album Talazo 84 that same year. Encouraged by the positive reception of the album, Pasuma went on to release his debut music album in 1993. Pasuma released his album Recognition in 1993. Since then, he has released over 30 albums and established himself as a prominent figure in the Fuji music scene in Nigeria.

Pasuma has collaborated with various recording artists, including Bola Abimbola and King Sunny Ade. In addition to his music career, he has appeared in several Nigerian films, such as Iyanje, Gangs of Lagos and Alenibare.

On 6 September 2015, he was named Best Indigenous Artist of the Year at the Nigeria Entertainment Awards, surpassing artists like Olamide, Phyno, and Flavour.

In 2020, Pasuma released the album MMM (Money Making Machine) during the COVID-19 pandemic. He stated that the album was intended to entertain his fans at a time when parties and large gatherings were restricted due to the pandemic. MMM was well-received and contributed to his popularity, particularly among listeners who had previously associated the Fuji genre with older audiences.

In 2021, Pasuma received the Best International Music Video award at the Hollywood and African Prestigious Awards (HAPAwards).

In 2022, he released the Afro-Fuji single Omo Ologo, featuring Qdot, which received critical acclaim. That same year, he released two Fuji albums titled Legendary and Human Nature, the latter being a December-themed project.

== Net worth ==
As of September 2025, Pasuma's net worth is estimated to be between $500,000 and $1,000,000 according to Talk49ja. This substantial wealth has earned him a spot among the top four richest Fuji musicians in Nigeria. His financial success is reflected in his numerous properties and investments, not just in Nigeria, but across various countries as well.

== Selected videography ==
=== Film ===
| Year | Title | Role | Notes |
|---|---|---|---|
| 2018 | Alenibare | Girl | |
| 2018 | Iyanje | Sam | |
| 2021 | A Naija Christmas | Himself | |
| 2021 | Under the Carpet | Himself | |
| 2021 | The Ghost and the Tout Too | Himself | |
| 2023 | Gangs of Lagos | London | |

Music Video

| Year | Title | Director | Ref |
|---|---|---|---|
| 2016 | Aiye Miami (Remix) As featured artist | H2G Films | |
