= Dundun =

Dundun may refer to:

- The Yoruba talking drum
- Dunun, dundun or doundoun, a family of West African bass drums
- Dunedin, the second-largest city in the South Island of New Zealand
- Dundun, a snack in Yoruba Nigerian cuisine, made by roasting or deep-frying slices of yam
- Dun Dun Noodles

== See also ==
- "Dunn Dunn", the second single from Shawty Lo's debut solo album, Units in the City
