= Gbedu =

Type of drum used in traditional Yoruba music

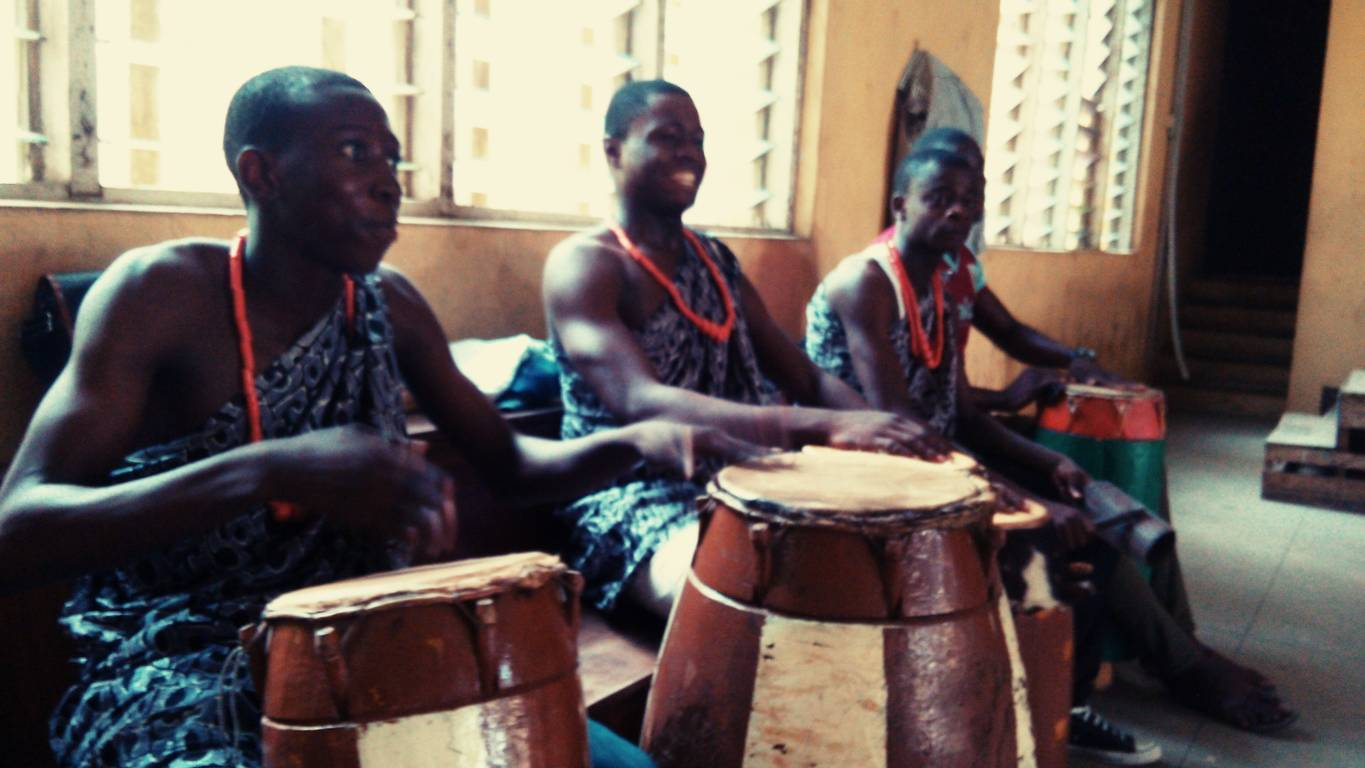
Drummers of traditional Gbedu drum in Yoruba land of Nigeria

Gbedu literally means "big drum" and is a percussion instrument traditionally used in ceremonial Yoruba music in Nigeria and Benin. More recently, the word has come to be used to describe forms of Nigerian Afrobeats music.

== Tradition ==
The Gbedu drum is traditionally used on state occasions or during ceremonies of Ogboni, the ancient Yoruba secret society. The Gbedu, also called Ogido, is one of the four major drums in traditional Yoruba drum sets; the other major drums are the Dundun/Gangan or talking drum, the Batá drum and the Sakara drum. Each drum comprises drums of different sizes, usually referred to as "children" of the mother drum (iya ilu). The mother drum, being whichever is the biggest in a set and playing the lead role while other drums play in support. The Gbedu backing drums are each played by a drummer using both his open palm and a stick.

Among the Yoruba, the Gbedu drum signifies royalty. The largest of the Yoruba drums, it is played during important functions. In ceremonies such the rite of Isagun, the Oba might dance to the music of the drum. If anyone else used the drum they were arrested for sedition.

In early times it was considered that the large and ornately carved drum had a protecting spirit, that of the slave who was sacrificed when it was made. The drum is covered in carvings representing animals, birds and the phallus. When sacrifices were made at ceremonies where the drum was used, some of the blood was sprinkled on the carvings, along with palm wine, egg yolks and the feathers of sacrificed chickens. The carved face of the iya ilu might include an image of Olokun, goddess of the sea, considered the "face of worship".

It is recorded that during the last days of the Oyo Empire, when the Fulani had captured Ilorin and become masters of Oyo, Sita, Emir of Ilorin required the Alaafin of Oyo Oluewu to visit him and pay homage. Oluewu had the Gbedu drum beaten before him as he travelled. When Sita asked about the drum and was told it was played only in the presence of a king, he became angry, saying that there could only be one king, himself, and ordered the Gbedu drum to be taken away.

An old Yoruba proverb says "unless the he-goat dies, no one can make a gbedu drum from its skin". The implication is that a person will be able to look out for their own interests while they are alive. Another proverb says "the hide of a pig cannot be used to make a gbedu drum", meaning that a given material cannot be used for all purposes. "No thief steals a gbedu drum" is a warning not to attempt the impossible.

== Modern usage ==
In modern Nigeria, the Gbedu and its relatives continue to be used, but the word has taken new meanings. Fela Kuti included the traditional Gbedu drum in his ensemble, with a percussionist pounding out a thunderous rhythm from an eight-foot drum lying on its side. Afrobeat ensembles often include the Akuba, a set of three small Yoruba congas played with sticks that are related to the Gbedu. Afrobeat musician Kola Ogunkoya uses the term "Afro Gbedu" to describe his style of music, which includes jazz, highlife, Jùjú, funk and traditional Yoruba music. Dele Sosimi, who played with Fela Kuti in the 1980s, later formed an Afrobeat group named "Gbedu Resurrection". The word Gbedu has more recently been used to describe Nigerian Afropop. For many young people, the word now simply means "groove".
