= Fuji music =

Music genre

Fuji
- Stylistic origins: Wéré music; sákárà music; highlife; yoruba music; aró music
- Cultural origins: 1960s, Lagos, Nigeria
- Typical instruments: Gudugudu; dùndún; congas; vocals; ṣẹ̀kẹ̀rẹ̀; agogô; bongos; guitar; keyboard; bass guitar; gángàn; batá; gbedu; aró drum; aró cymbal

Subgenres
- Afro-Fuji; Bonsue Fuji; Fancy Fuji; Funk Fuji; Merengue Fuji; Okhlahama Fuji; Pata Olokun Fuji; Talazo Fuji; Wákà Fuji

Fusion genres
- Classical Fuji; Fuji Fusion; Fujipiano; Fuji Reggae; Neo-Fuji

Regional scenes
- Nigeria

Other topics
- Apala

Fújì is a genre of Yoruba popular music that emerged in Nigeria in the 1960s. It evolved from the improvisational wéré music also known as ajísari (meaning "waking up for sari"), performed to awaken Muslims before dawn during the fasting season of Ramadan. Fuji music was named after the Japanese stratovolcano-mountain, Mount Fuji by Alhaji Sikiru Ayinde Barrister (pioneer of Fuji). It features energetic beats, diverse Yoruba rhythms, and call-and-response vocals. Fuji's influence extends into contemporary music, with its hooks and rhythms frequently appearing in Nigerian hip hop.

In February 2024, professor and filmmaker Saheed Aderinto released the first episode of The Fuji Documentary titled "Mr. Fuji: Barry Wonder" which chronicles the story of Fuji music creator Sikiru Ayinde Barrister.

== Etymology ==
Sikiru Ololade Ayinde Balogun Barrister significantly popularized wéré music during the 1950s and 1960s and later coined the term "fuji" for his new innovation (fuji music) in an intriguingly unconventional manner. According to Barrister, "I came up with it when I saw a poster at an airport, advertising the Mount Fuji, which is the highest peak in Japan." Fújì should not be mistaken for the Yorùbá words "fúja" (to flee) or "fáájì" (enjoyment or leisure).

== History ==
Wéré music is an Islamic-influenced Yorùbá genre of music invented by Muslim singers and musicians in Yorùbá towns and cities in southwestern Nigeria to awaken Muslims fasting during Ramadan.

Toward the end of the colonial period during the 1950s, Alhaji Sikiru Ayinde Barrister, General Ayinla Kollington, Tunde King, Ayinla Omowura, Alhaji Kola Adegoke, Alhaji Kamoru Ayinde, Alhaji Salami Ayinde, Alhaji Dauda Epo-Akara and Ganiyu Kuti (Gani Irefin) founded and popularized wéré. Throughout the 1950s and 1960s, numerous wéré performance groups emerged within Muslim communities in and around the cities of Ibadan, Lagos, and Ìlọrin. These early performers drew great inspiration from Yoruba sákárà music, featuring the sákárà drum (without the violin-like goje often played with an accompanying fiddle). Notable Lagos-based wéré performers during the early independence years include Sikiru Omo Abiba, Ajadi Ganiyu, Ayinde Muniru Mayegun (General Captain), Ajadi Bashiru, Sikiru Onishemo, Kawu Aminu, Jibowu Barrister, Ayinde Fatayi, Kasali Alani, Saka Olayigbade, Ayinla Yekinni, and Bashiru Abinuwaye.

As various styles evolved, some performers played mouth organs (harmonicas) between wéré interludes within their compositions. Sikiru Ayinde Barrister was the lead singer and composer of the popular wéré group, Jibowu Barrister, under the leadership of Alhaji Jibowu Barrister. During the 1960s, Sikiru Ayinde Barrister, Kollington Ayinla and other young wéré groups rocked Lagos and its environs.

The advancement from wéré music to fuji music marked a profound transformation within Yoruba musical traditions. During the late 1960s and early 1970s, Alhaji Sikiru Ayinde Barrister (fuji music pioneer) began to innovate on the foundational elements of wéré music by integrating influences from diverse genres such as apala, juju and afrobeat, resulting in the introduction of a modernized approach to both instrumentation and performance. The amalgamation of traditional and contemporary elements gave rise to fuji music. Popularizers of wéré music, who played a pivotal role in its early development, adapted their musical practices to foster and popularize fuji music, effectively bridging traditional Yoruba sounds with a contemporary audience.

In one of Barrister's early albums, chiding and educating critics who dubbed fújì a "local music," Sikiru Ayinde Barrister described fújì music as a combination of music consisting of sákárà, Apala, jùjú, Aró, Afrobeat, gudugudu, and some elements of highlife. Sikiru Ayinde Barrister played a significant role in popularizing fújì music by introducing it to international audiences. In the 1970s, he began touring across Europe, with a notable presence in England, and continued to the United States throughout the 1980s.

Between 1970 and throughout the 1980s, other fújì musicians included Fatai Adio, Saura Alhaji, Student Fuji, Rahimi Ayinde (Bokote), Ramoni Akanni, Love Azeez, Waidi Akangbe, Sikiru Olawoyin, Agbada Owo, Iyanda Sawaba, Ejire Shadua, Wahabi Ilori, Wasiu Ayinde Marshall (K1 De Ultimate), Suleiman Adigun, Sakaniyau Ejire, and Wasiu Ayinla.

While male musicians dominated fuji, reflecting fuji’s origins in wéré music, women artists developed Islamic and interchangeably wákà fuji. Islamic is a popular name for the genre of women's fújì-related music, particularly in and around the city of Ìlọrin, while wákà is a more general pan-Yoruba term for the Muslim women's genre. It emerged in the late 1950s and was originally performed by women vocalists for Islamic events such as weddings and celebrations for pilgrims returning from Mecca. In the 1980s, professional Muslim women vocalists fronted their own fújì bands. While the themes and aesthetics of Islamic were more closely related to Muslim morality than fújì, there was a significant overlap between wákà fuji and traditional fújì.

In the early 1970s, Alhaji Kolington Ayinla (Baba Alatika) emerged as a prominent fuji performer and rival to Sikiru Ayinde Barrister. Wasiu Ayinde Marshall (K1 De Ultimate), who had been a protégé of Barrister, began to gain recognition in the late 1980s and 1990s with Talazo Fuji. Adewale Ayuba, introduced Bonsue Fuji which resonated with a wide audience. Abass Akande Obesere integrated slang into his fuji songs which contributed to the genre's evolution.

=== 2000s: Modernization ===
Throughout the 2000s, the fuji music scene continued to thrive with prominent artists including Wasiu Alabi Pasuma, King Saheed Osupa, Shanko Rasheed, Remi Aluko (Igwe1 Fuji) and others. While most traditional fuji music songs' lyrics remained in Yorùbá, the genre had increasingly incorporated English and Nigerian Pidgin. Popular modern fújì musicians in the 2000s included Rasheed Ayinde Adekunle Merenge, Abass Akande obesere (PK 1), Sir Shina Akanni, Alhaji Isiaka Inyanda Sawaba, Adewale Ayuba, Wasiu Alabi Pasuma (Oganla 1), King Dr.Saheed Osupa (His Majesty), Late Sunny T Adesokan (Omo Ina ton ko fújì), Alayeluwa Sulaimon Alao Adekunle Malaika (KS1, Original), Shefiu Adekunle Alao (Omo Oko), Shanko Rasheed, Sule Adio (Atawéwé), Tajudeen Alabi Istijabah (Oju Kwara), Wasiu Ajani (Mr. Pure Water), Taiye Currency, Alhaji Komi Jackson, Remi Aluko (Igwe fújì), Muri Alabi Thunder, Karube Aloma, Oyama Azeez (Arabesa, Alapatinrin, The Modern Real Fuji Creator), Wasiu Container, Konkolo Wally G, Murphy Adisa Sabaika (Madiba 2), Abiodun Ike Minister (Aremo Alayeluwa), Tunde Ileiru, Karubey Shimiu, Adeolu Akanni (Paso Egba), Shamu Nokia, (Quintessential) Sunny Melody, Olusegun Ologo, Segun Michael, Bola Abimbola, and, Cripsymixtee, Global T, Muri Ikoko.

== Characteristics ==
Fújì is defined by its use of a diverse array of traditional Yoruba percussion instruments and its lively, energetic tempos. The genre features complex rhythms created by instruments like the dùndún and gbedu, which contributes to its distinctive and intricate rhythmic patterns. Additionally, fújì utilizes a call-and-response vocal style, where the lead singer's phrases are answered by backing vocalists, creating an interactive musical dialogue. The blend of rhythmic complexity, upbeat tempo, and vocal interplay defines fuji music.

== Modern fújì musical styles ==
=== Classical fuji ===
Classical fuji is a genre that merges American hip hop with fuji. The fusion of fuji and American hip hop began in Nigeria during the 1990s and early 2000s. King Wasiu Ayinde Marshal coined the term, classical fuji and played a pivotal role in its development. Another prominent artists in the genre are Wasiu Alabi Pasuma, Saheed Osupa, Remi Aluko and many others.

=== Street pop: Neo-fuji, fujipiano and fuji-fusion ===
Street pop, also referred to as street hop, is a Nigerian experimental rap and vocal performance genre that evolved from Nigerian hip hop, Nigerian street music, popular music, Western music genres and Nigerian pop. Emerging in the 21st century, the genre draws on elements of fuji music additionally fuji-centered variants exist, including neo fuji, fujipiano and fuji-fusion. The fuji-fusion, fujipiano and neo-fuji musical styles are attributed to 9ice, Lord of Ajasa, Olamide, Asake, King Saheed Osupa, Remi Aluko, Naira Marley, Qdot and Seyi Vibez.
