= Hawaiian guitar =

Hawaiian guitar may refer to:

- Lap steel guitar, a type of steel guitar without pedals that is typically played with the instrument in a horizontal position across the performer's lap
- Ukulele, a type of small, guitar-like instrument popularized in Hawaii
