= Sakara music =

Type of Nigerian popular music

- Stylistic origins: Yoruba music
- Cultural origins: 1930s Lagos
- Typical instruments: Goje violin and Sakara drum.

Sakara music is a form of popular Nigerian music based in the traditions of Yoruba music. It generally takes the form of praise songs that are accompanied by traditional Yoruba instruments such as the solemn-sounding goje (spike fiddle), and the small round sakara drum, which is similar to a tambourine and is beaten with a stick. Sakara music overlays nasalized, melismatic vocals (which are inspired by the singing of East Africa, as well as by Arabic traditions) on a rhythmic accompaniment provided by the traditional percussion and string instruments. The music is often brooding and philosophical in mood.

One of the first performers of this type of music in Lagos was Abibu Oluwa, who started playing in the 1930s. On his death in 1964 his place in the band was taken by Salami Alabi (Lefty) Balogun (October 1913 - 29 December 1981), a talking drummer, who released over 35 records. Other members of the band included Baba Mukaila, and Joseph (Yussuf) Olatunju. Yusuf Olatunji (alias Baba l’Egba), who died in 1978, did much to popularize the musical genre and released many records on the Phillips Nigeria label. A street in Abeokuta is named after him.

Sakara music had considerable influence on other genres, including jùjú and Nigerian hip hop. Fuji music is a mixture of Muslim traditional Were music with elements drawn from Sakara and Apala music. When talking about style and the type of music that Sakara is similar to, people find it similar to Western country music. The Sakara genre actually derived its name from the predominant instrument, the Sakara, which is a membranophone instrument with only one covered side. Sakara is also mentioned to be pretty similar to soul music. It is also becoming popular on some radio stations, such as Premier FM, Amuludun FM, and Radio OYO. These are among those in south-west Nigeria that provide their listeners with Sakara music. This type of music listeners have confessed to sleeping off while listening to the music, because Sakara is played mostly on the radio late at night.

== History and development ==
Sakara music started to develop in the 1930s, which was a time period of rapid cultural exchange in colonial Lagos. As a result of this, Yoruba musicians started to adapt indigenous style performances to their urban audiences. Sakara also started to emerge as a bridge between traditional Yoruba oral poetry and early Nigerian popular music.

Abibu Oluwa was one of the earliest known Sakara performers who influenced the establishment of the genre's fundamental musical structure and the style people performed in. However, after he died in 1964, his leadership passed to Salami Alabi Balogun (Lefty) . Salami was a highly influential talking drummer who recorded extensively and helped preserve Sakara music during its peak commercial period. At this time, Sakara was becoming more popular and present in Africa.

Another very central figure in the genre's quick expansion was Yusuf Olatunji. Yusuf was born in 1909, and he died in 1978. However, there are some questions about his actual place of birth, but some people claimed that he was a native of Iseyin in Oyo State, south-western Nigeria. He was born a Christian, but he converted to Islam and changed his name. After changing his name, his life drastically changed because his music started to really boom in the music industry. Through numerous recordings and performances, he brought Sakara music to a wider national audience. His influence was such that a street in Abeokuta was later named in his honor.

== Musical characteristics ==
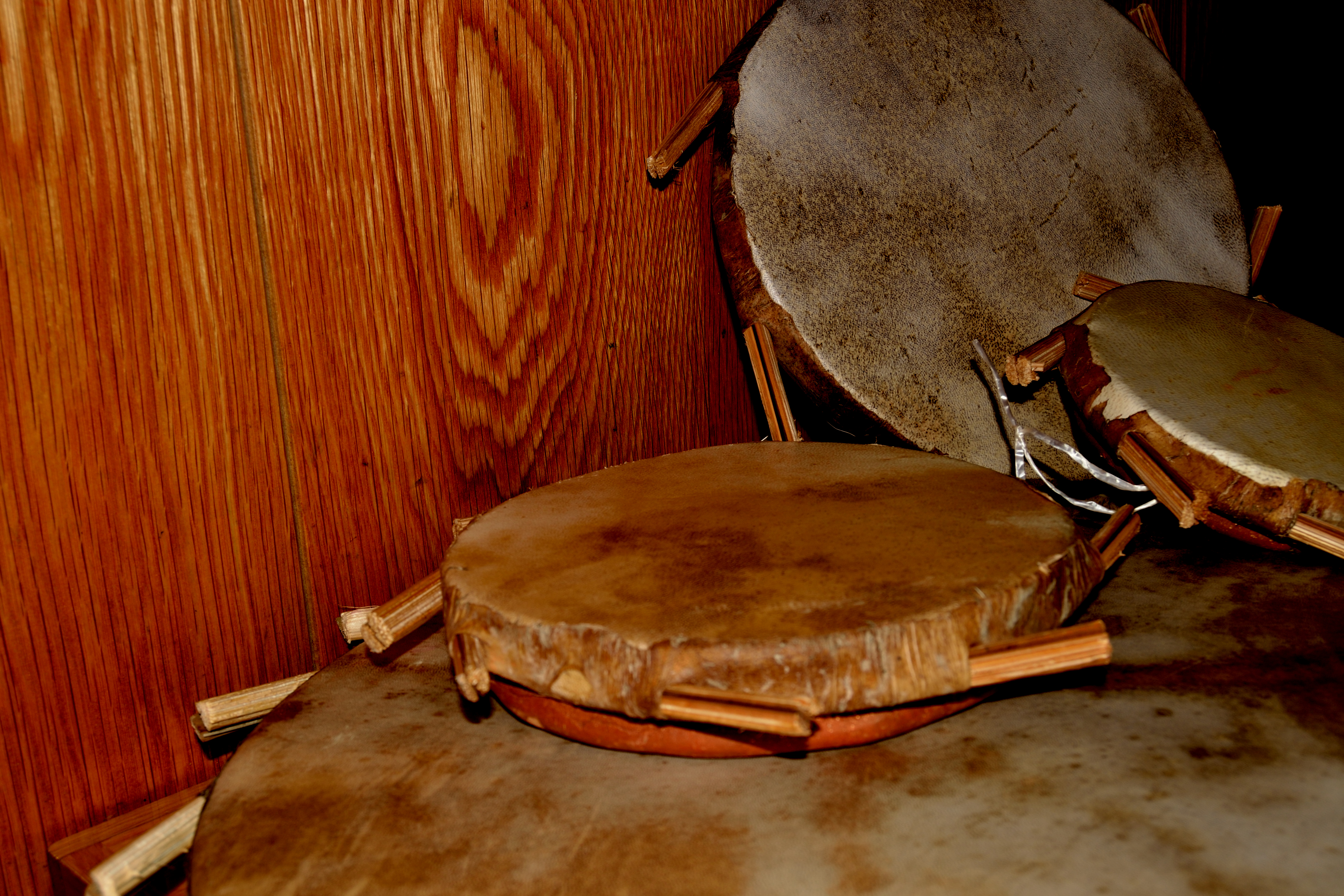
Sakara musical instrument commonly used

Sakara music is rooted in broader Yoruba musical traditions that emphasize layered rhythms, oral poetry, and communal meaning. Sakara music, because of its uniqueness, has had a significant influence on many other genres in Nigeria. Some include juju and some forms of Nigerian hip-hop. Its rhythmic foundation is centered on the sakara drum, a shallow frame drum that sets a slow to mid-tempo pulse, often accompanied by supporting percussion such as agogo (double bells) or shekere, as well as melodic instruments like the goje. Sakara music is characterized by a slow to mid-tempo rhythmic structure, dominated by the sakara drum and supported by traditional string instruments such as the goje.

Vocals are typically melodic, which draws influence from Islamic chant traditions and trans-Saharan musical aesthetics. Most of the time, Sakara songs lyrically often take the form of oriki (praise poetry), mental reflections, moral instruction, and social observation. Sakara performances, also known for containing some influence from Yoruba dances, are usually very reflective, emotionally restrained, and emphasize wisdom and dignity rather than dance-driven cheerfulness. Many of the Yoruba dances are connected to religious practices; for example, many pay homage to the deities (Orisha) and connect with the spiritual realm. Overall, Sakara music emphasizes deep reflection, cultural continuity, and moral authority rather than just dance, which distinguishes it from the more rhythmically intense Yoruba genres.

== Cultural significance ==
The influence that Sakara music has had historically within the Yoruba society has functioned as a medium for praise, moral authority, and social memory. The music and the performances that come with it have become more common at weddings, religious gatherings, and even funerals! But this is particularly seen within Muslim Yoruba communities, where the genre's style and tonal aspect align with Islamic culture.

Sakara musicians originally occupied the role of cultural communicators, addressing big issues such as leadership, faith, social responsibility, and even communal ethics. Through this position in the African culture, Sakara contributed to the preservation of oral poetry, the Yoruba language, and the worldview in rapidly urbanizing environments.

== Influence and legacy ==
Sakara music has played and is playing a crucial role in the development of modern Nigerian popular genres. Its vocal structure, praise-singing traditions, and rhythmic aspects influenced the evolution of Juju, Apala, and Fuji music. Although Sakkara's worldwide visibility declined in the late 20th century, its stylistic influence persists in current Nigerian music, including genres such as Afrocentric hip-hop and fusion genres that incorporate Yoruba lyrics and traditional drums. These all forms as markers of cultural identity. Today, Sakara music is widely regarded as an important historical and cultural precursor to modern Yoruba popular music and a symbol of the continuity of culture and tradition within Nigerian musical history.

== Notable artists ==
- Abibu Oluwa
- Yusuf Olatunji
- Salami Alabi Balogun
