= Ayinla Kollington =

Nigerian musician

- Also known as: Baba Alatika; Kebe-n-Kwara; Baba Alagbado
- Born: 20 August 1949 (age 77)
- Origin: Ilota, Kwara, Nigeria
- Genre: Fuji music
- Occupation: Singer
- Years active: 1962–present

General Ayinla Kollington (born 20 August 1949), born Abdulrasaq Kolawole Ilori to Chief Ayanda Ilori, a Kingmaker and Alhaja Asiawu Mofodeke Ilori. He is a Nigerian Fuji musician and one of the pioneers of the genre. He hailed from Ilota, a town on the outskirts of Ilorin, Kwara State, Nigeria. He is also called Baba Alatika, Kebe-n-Kwara, Baba Alagbado.

== Life ==
Ayinla Kollington ranks alongside his friend and competitor Ayinde Barrister as the two most important artists to dominate Fuji music from its inception in the 1970s through to the 1990s, by which time it had grown to become one of the most popular dance genres in Nigeria. Between the mid-1970s and late '80s, Kollington ranked with Barrister as the leading star of Nigerian fuji music – such as apala and waka, a Muslim-dominated relation of juju, retaining that style's vocal and percussion ingredients but abandoning its use of electric guitars in order to obtain a more traditional, roots-based sound.

Kollington began recording for Nigerian EMI in 1974, and in 1978 achieved a pronounced, but temporary, lead over Barrister when his introduction of the powerful bata drum (fuji had until that time relied almost exclusively on talking, or "squeeze", drums) caught the imagination of record buyers. In 1982, when fuji was beginning to seriously rival juju as Nigeria's most popular contemporary roots music, he set up his own label, Kollington Records, through which he released no less than 30 albums over the next five years. As the popularity of fuji grew, and the market became big enough to support both artists, Kollington and Barrister's enmity diminished. By 1983, both men were able to stand side by side as mourners at the funeral of apala star Haruna Ishola. A new and equally public rivalry emerged in the mid-'80s, this time with "Queen of Waka" star Salawa Abeni, who exchanged bitter personal insults with Kollington over a series of album releases and counter-releases.

At the start of the 1980s, he started his own record company, Kollington Records, to release his music and remains to this day a prolific artist, having recorded more than 100 albums.

In 2019, Kollington revealed why he had dropped the military life for music.
