= K1 De Ultimate =

Nigerian musician

K1 De Ultimate M.O.N Mayegun of Yorubaland. OLORI Omo Oba Akile Ijebuland
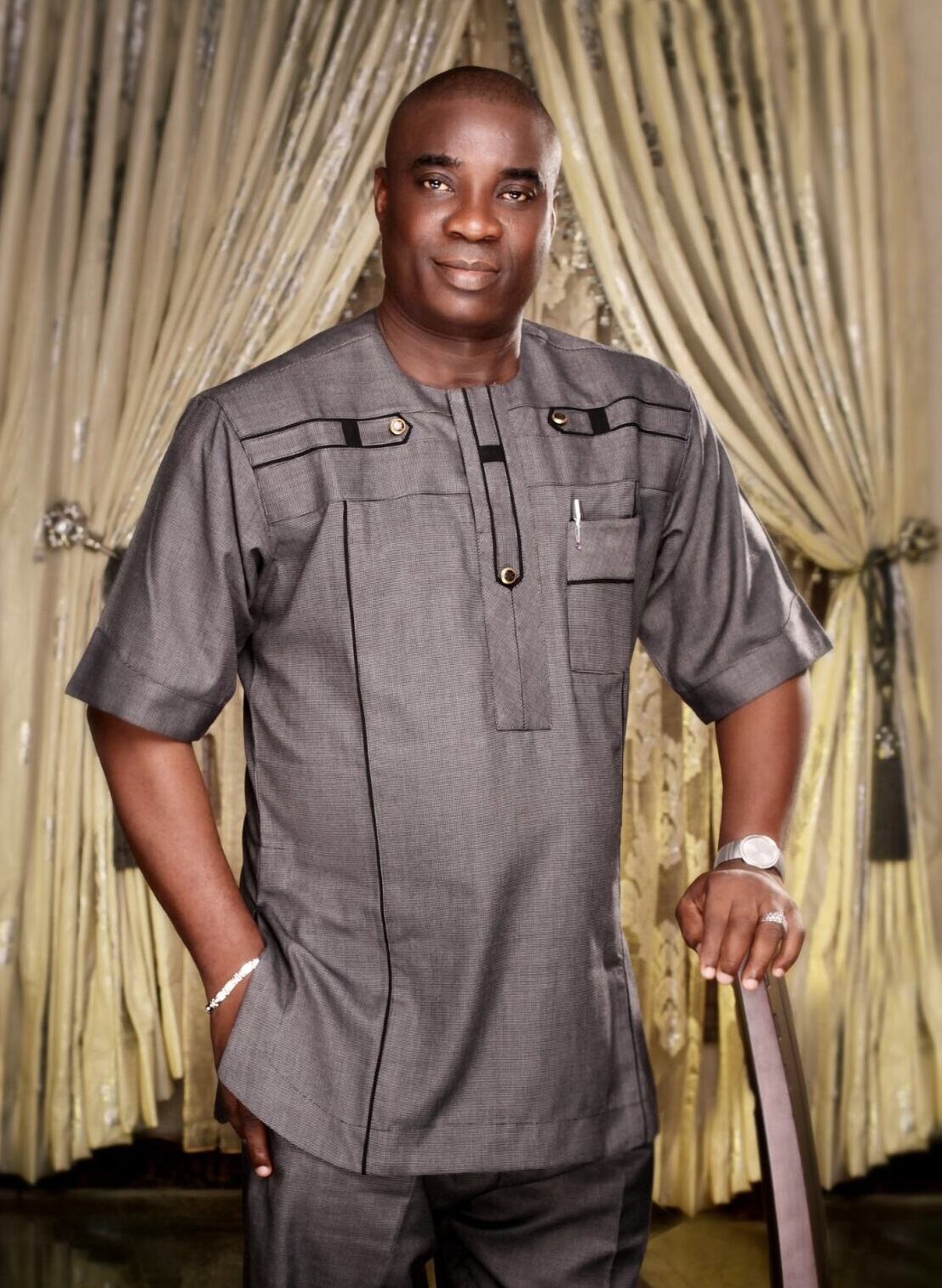

Background information
- Also known as: Igi Jegede, (King of Fuji Music, Oba Orin, Arabambi, Mayegun General, Ade Ori Okin) (Oba Orin) (King Wasiu Ayinde Marshal) Kwam1, (k1 de Ultimate)
- Born: Wasiu Ayinde Adewale Olasunkanmi Omogbolahan Anifowoshe; 3 March 1957 (age 69); Agarawu, Lagos State, Nigeria
- Origin: Ijebu Ode, Ogun State, Nigeria
- Genres: Fuji music
- Occupations: singer, performer
- Years active: 1980–present
- Label: Fuji Repete

Wasiu Omogbolahan Olasunkanmi Adewale Ayinde Marshal MON (born 3 March 1957), known professionally as K1 De Ultimate, is a Nigerian Fuji musician. He popularised a brand of the genre based on the work of its creator, Ayinde Barrister, known as "Talazo Fuji".

== Background ==
Marshal developed an interest in music when he was eight. His parents initially opposed, but he continued to pursue his passion and by the time he was 15, he had won several local musical competitions. He later became a member of Ayinde Barrister's band, the Supreme Fuji Commanders, from 1975 to 1978 after previously serving as an instrument packer. He also adopted the name of Ayinde after seeking the permission and blessing of his mentor, Ayinde Barrister. He released his first album titled Iba which included the track "Abode Mecca" in 1980, and thereafter, his most successful album Talazo '84 in 1984. He has received many titles and music awards.

== Music career ==
Marshal began his international tour between North America and Europe in 1986 and performed at Hammersmith Town Hall in 1987, followed by New York City, with the full Talazo Band on 28 September 1990. Subsequent tours included London Yuppie 1 & 2 Nights (1991-1992), a European tour in 1995, Berlin in 1997, North America in 1998, Canada in 2000, and a USA tour in 2003. He has continued touring annually since then. In 1995, he gave the first Fuji performance at WOMAD Festival, and he has also performed at Troxy, WOMEX and SOB's.

== Accolades and recognition ==
- Badabarawu of Ogijo in 1985
- Ekerin Amuludun of Ibadanland in 1986
- Golden Mercury of Africa Title in 1986
- Honoris Causa of Music at Saint John University Bakersfield California USA in 1989
- Crowned as King of Fuji (Oluaye Fuji Music) at NTA Ibadan in 1993
- The Oluomo of Lagos by King Adeyinka Oyekan of Lagos in 1999
- On Monday, 13 January 2020, he was installed by the Alaafin of Oyo, Oba Lamidi Adeyemi as the first Mayegun of Yorubaland
- Member of the Order of the Niger (MON) by President Muhammad Buhari on 11 October 2022
- Crowned Olori Omooba of Akile Ijebuland on 26 September 2023 by King Sikiru Adetona Awujale of Ijebuland and in the same month was installed as Otunba Fidipote Mole of Fidipote dynasty

== Controversy ==
ValueJet incident

In August 2025, Marshal was removed from a ValueJet flight after a confrontation over a flask suspected to contain alcohol. He obstructed the aircraft's taxiing and was briefly placed on a no-fly list. He later apologised, stating the flask contained water for medical reasons.

== Discography ==
Studio albums

- Iba (1980)
- Esi Oro (1981)
- Igbalaye (1982)
- Talazo System (1984)
- Talazo '84 (1984)
- Ise L'Ogun Ise (1984)
- Ijo olomo (1984)
- Talazo Disco 85 (1985)
- Oloriki Metta / Ki De Se (1985) – with the Talazo Fuji Commanders Organisation
- Elo-Sora (1985)
- Pomposity (1985)
- Ori (1986)
- Tiwa Dayo (1986)
- Erin Goke – Lecture (1986)
- Baby Je Kajo (1986)
- Talazo In London (1987)
- Aiyé (1987)
- Adieu Awolowo (1987)
- Sun-Splash (1988)
- Fuji Headline (1988)
- My Dear Mother (1988)
- Fuji Rapping (1989)
- Achievement (1989)
- Jo Fun Mi (Dance For Me) (1990)
- American Tips (1991)
- Fuji Collections (1991)
- The Ultimate (1993)
- Consolidation (1995)
- Reflection (1995)
- Talazo Fuji Party Music (1995)
- Legacy (1996)
- Faze 2 Global Tour '96 (1996)
- History (1997)
- Berlin Compact Disk (1997)
- Fuji Fusion (Okofaji Carnival) (1999)
- New Era (2000)
- Faze 3 (2000)
- Message (2001)
- Statement (2001)
- New Lagos (2001)
- Gourd (2002)
- Big Deal (2003)
- Flavour (2006)
- Tribute To My Mentor (2011)
- Instinct (2012)
- Fuji Time (2012)
- 22 Dec Fuji Ep: Let Music Flow (2017)
- Fuji: The Sound EP (2020)
- Timeless (2023)

Live Albums

- Talazo System (1984)
- Omo Akorede (1984)
- Golden Mercury (1986)
- Siliky (1989)
- American Tour Live (1990)
- Yuppie Night 1 & 2 (1991)
- Consolidation Live Ade Bendel (1994)
- Sabaka Night (1995)
- Oju Opon (1995)
- Fadaka Club (1995)
- London Hamburg Amsterdam Berlin 95 (1995)
- London Hamburg Amsterdam Berlin Paris 97 (1997)
- United Kingdom Live (1988)
- New York Chicago Atlanta Houston & Canada Tour – Toronto Montreal Live (1998)
- New Era Live United Kingdom (1999)
- Afinni (1999)
- Canada Live (2000)
- United Kingdom Ireland Tour Live (2007)
- The Truth Live (2007)

Selected Concerts

- Eko for Show USA (1990)
- Womad Concert (1995)
- Benson & Hedges (1997)
- Benson & Hedges Loud in Lagos (1999)

== Awards ==
Year	Nominee / work	Award	Result
2013	K1 De Ultimate	The Headies Hall Of Fame	Won
2014	K1 De Ultimate	City People Lifetime Achievement Award	Won
