= Ayinde Barrister =

Nigerian musician (1948–2010)

Sikiru Ayinde Barrister MFR
- Born: Sikiru Ololade Ayinde Balogun; 9 February 1948; Ibadan, Oyo State, Nigeria
- Died: 16 December 2010 (aged 62); St. Mary's Hospital, London, United Kingdom
- Burial place: Isolo, Lagos State, Nigeria
- Known for: Creation of Fuji music from Were music
- Children: Barry Showkey, Barry Jhay
- Musical career
- Also known as: Alhaji Agba Barusati
- Genre: Fuji
- Occupations: Singer-songwriter, entertainer, military officer
- Years active: 1965–2010

Sikiru Ololade Ayinde Balogun, MFR, (9 February 1948 – 16 December 2010) better known by his stage names Ayinde Barrister and Barry Wonder, was a Nigerian-born Yoruba singer-songwriter, music performer and producer. He is regarded as a pioneer of Fuji and Wéré music. After his first break into music in 1965, Ayinde Barrister went on to release over 70 studio albums. In 2024, the first episode of The Fuji Documentary, titled "Mr. Fuji: Barry Wonder," which chronicles his life and career, was released by director and producer, Saheed Aderinto.

== Early life ==
Ayinde Barrister was born on 9 February 1948, to the family of Salawu Balogun, a trader from the Dakeja compound, Ayeye, Ibadan. His father was a butcher.

== Education ==
He had his early education at Muslim Mission School and the Model School, Mushin, Lagos. He later studied typing and other commercial courses at Yaba Polytechnic.

== Career ==
Ayinde Barrister started playing music at a young age as an ajiwere singer during the period of Ramadan; he continued playing music in between various jobs. He worked as a typist for Nigerian Breweries and was later enlisted as a clerk in the Nigerian Army during the Nigerian Civil War. He served in the 10th Brigade of the 2nd Division of the Nigerian Army under Colonel Adeniran and fought in Awka, Abagana and Onitsha. After the war, he was posted to the Army Signals Headquarters, Apapa, and later to the Army Resettlement Centre, Oshodi. He left the army to become a full-time musician and established a 34-member band of percussionists and vocalists called the "Supreme Fuji Commanders".

=== Music career ===
In 1966, Ayinde Barrister released his first LP record. At the time, he regularly played with his band at events around Ebute Meta and Lagos, mostly for Muslim clients. He initially released records under the label African Songs Ltd before starting his own label, Siky-Oluyole Records. The LP's released under African Songs include Ile Aiye Dun Pupo/Love in Tokyo (India Sound) (1976) and Isimillahi (1977). By the early 1980s, Ayinde Barrister and Fuji music had become accepted by all religions in the country. He went on to release several albums under his label, including Iwa (1982), Nigeria (1983), Fuji Garbage (1988) and New Fuji Garbage (1993). His later works included the popular album Reality (2004). In 1982, he had a publicised feud with fellow fuji singer, Ayinla Kollington.

Ayinde Barrister had a couple of successful shows in London in 1990 and 1993 performing what later became known as the Fuji Garbage sound.

=== Musical style ===
His fuji music is a blend of earlier traditional musical genres such as Apala, Sakara, Awurebe and others. With Fuji music, Ayinde Barrister revolutionised traditional Yoruba music while still projecting values of good behaviour, respect for elders and the struggles against life's forces. He often used his music as a tool for commentary on issues of national concern, particularly politics. He was also known for his praise-singing skills.

=== Awards ===
Ayinde Barrister received several awards during his lifetime and music career. In 1983, he was awarded an honorary PhD in music by the City University of Los Angeles. He was conferred with the national honour of Member of the Order of the Federal Republic (MFR) by President Olusegun Obasanjo in 2006.

== Selected discography ==
- Ejeka Gbo T'Olorun (7″; Niger Songs ??) (1966)
- Vol.1: Waya Rabi
- Vol.2: Alayinde Ma De O
- Vol.3: Mecca Special
- Vol.4: Itan Anobi Rasao
- Vol.5: E Sa Ma Mi Lengbe
- Vol.6: Ori Mi Ewo Ninse / Majority Boy (1975)
- Vol.7: Ile Aiye Dun Pupo / Love in Tokyo (India Sound) (1975)
- Vol.8: Fuji Exponent (1976)
- Vol.9
- Vol. 10 (African Songs, 1977)
- Bisimilai (African Songs, 1977)
- Omo Nigeria (African Songs, 1977)
- Olojo Eni Mojuba (Siky Oluyole, 1978)
- Our Late Artistes (Siky Oluyole, 1978)
- London Special (Siky Oluyole, 1979)
- Fuji Reggae Series 2 (Siky Oluyole, 1979)
- Eyo Nbo Anobi (Siky Oluyole, 1979)
- Awa O Ja (Siky Oluyole, 1979)
- Fuji Disco (Siky Oluyole, 1980)
- Oke Agba (Siky Oluyole, 1980)
- Aiye (Siky Oluyole, 1980)
- Family Planning (Siky Oluyole, 1981)
- Suru Baba Iwa (Siky Oluyole, 1981)
- Ore Lope (Siky Oluyole, 1981)
- E Sinmi Rascality (Siky Oluyole, 1982)
- Iwa (Siky Oluyole, 1982)
- Ise Logun Ise (No More War) (Siky Oluyole, 1982)
- Eku Odun (Siky Oluyole, 1982)
- Ijo Olomo (Siky Oluyole, 1983)
- Nigeria (Siky Oluyole, 1983)
- Love (Siky Oluyole, 1983)
- Barry Special (Siky Oluyole, 1983)
- Military (Siky Oluyole, 1984)
- Appreciation (Siky Oluyole, 1984)
- Fuji Vibration 84/85 (Siky Oluyole, 1984)
- Destiny (Siky Oluyole, 1985)
- Superiority (Siky Oluyole, 1985)
- Fertiliser (Siky Oluyole, 1985)
- Okiki (Siky Oluyole, 1986)
- Inferno(Siky Oluyole, 1996)
- America Special (Siky Oluyole, 1986)
- Ile Aye Ogun (Siky Oluyole, 1987)
- Maturity (Siky Oluyole, 1987)
- Barry Wonder (Siky Oluyole, 1987)
- Wonders at 40 (Siky Oluyole, 1987)
- Fuji Garbage (Siky Oluyole, 1988)
- Fuji Garbage Series II (Siky Oluyole, 1988)
- Current Affairs (Siky Oluyole, 1989)
- Fuji Garbage Series III (Siky Oluyole, 1989)
- Music Extravaganza (Siky Oluyole, 1990)
- Fuji Waves (Siky Oluyole, 1991)
- Fantasia Fuji (Siky Oluyole, 1991)
- Fuji Explosion (Siky Oluyole, 1992)
- Dimensional Fuji (Siky Oluyole, 1993)
- New Fuji Garbage (Siky Oluyole, 1993)
- The Truth (Siky Oluyole, 1994)
- Precaution (Siky Oluyole, 1995)
- Olympics Atlanta '96 cassette (Siky Oluyole, 1996)
- Olympics '96 London Version cassette (Zmirage Productions, 1997)
- with Queen Salawa Abeni Evening Of Sound cassette (Zmirage Productions, 1997)
- Barry On Stage cassette (Siky Oluyole, 1997)
- Democracy (Siky Oluyole, 1999)
- Mr. Fuji (Barry Black, 1998)
- Millennium Stanza (Fuji Chambers, 2000)
- Reality and Questionnaire ( 2005).
- Precision and Controversy (2007)
- Superiority
- Fuji Booster
- Fuji Missile
- Wisdom and Correction(2008)
- Image and Gratitude(2009)

== Bibliography ==
- 'Dayo Odeyemi (2001). Sikiru Ayinde Barrister: Mr. Fuji : Biography of the Man Behind the Creation of New Music Genre. DB-Hunters. ISBN 978-978-047-851-3.
- 'Dejo Kehinde; Ilori Abegunde (2003). African music, arts & folklores: Nigerian examples. Satellite.
- Saheed Aderinto (2024). "Mr. Fuji Barry: Wonder," Episode I of The Fuji Documentary.
