= Tiwa Savage discography =

Nigerian singer discography

- Savage performing at the SXSW London festival in 2025
- Studio albums: 4
- Compilation albums: 1
- Singles: 24
- Music videos: 10
- Promotional singles: 3
- Guest appearances: 5
- Cameo appearances: 1

The discography of Tiwa Savage, a Nigerian singer consists of four studio albums, one compilation album, 24 singles (including seven as featured artist), ten music videos, four promotional single, five guest appearances, and one cameo appearance.

== Albums ==
=== Studio albums ===
List of studio albums, with selected details
Title	Album details
Once Upon a Time	Released: July 3, 2013; Label: Mavin; Format: CD, LP, digital download
R.E.D.	Released: December 19, 2015; Label: Mavin, 323 Entertainment; Format: CD, LP, digital download
Celia	Released: August 28, 2020; Label: Motown, Universal Island
This One Is Personal	Released: August 29, 2024; Label: Everything Savage, Empire; Format: Streaming, digital download

=== Compilation albums ===
List of compilation albums, with selected details
Title	Album details
Solar Plexus (as part of the Mavins)	Released: May 8, 2012; Label: Mavin; Format: CD, LP, digital download

=== Soundtrack albums ===
List of soundtrack albums, with selected details
Title	Album details
Water & Garri (Original Motion Picture Soundtrack)	Released: May 10, 2024; Label: Everything Savage, Empire; Format: CD, LP, streaming, digital download

== EPs ==
Title	EP details
Sugarcane	Released: September 22, 2017; Label: Mavin Records, 323 Entertainment
Water & Garri	Released: August 20, 2021; Format: Digital download

== Singles ==
=== As lead artist ===
List of singles as lead artist, with selected chart positions
Title	Year	Peak chart positions					Album
Title	Year	NGR	UK Afro.	UK Dig.	US Afro.	US World	Album
"Kele Kele Love"	2010	—	—	—	—	—	Once Upon a Time
"Ife Wa Gbona" (featuring Leo Wonder)	2010	—	—	—	—	—	Once Upon a Time
"Love Me, Love Me, Love Me"	2011	—	—	—	—	—	Once Upon a Time
"Without My Heart" (featuring Don Jazzy)	2011	—	—	—	—	—	Once Upon a Time
"Folarin"	2012	—	—	—	—	—	Once Upon a Time
"Oma Ga"	2012	—	—	—	—	—	Solar Plexus
"Olorun Mi"	2013	—	—	—	—	—	Once Upon a Time
"Eminado" (featuring Don Jazzy)	2013	—	—	—	—	—	Once Upon a Time
"Love in Yellow"	2014	—	—	—	—	—	Non-album single
"My Darlin'"	2014	—	—	—	—	—	R.E.D.
"Standing Ovation" (featuring Olamide)	2016	—	—	—	—	—	R.E.D.
"Key to the City" (featuring Busy Signal)	2016	—	—	—	—	—	R.E.D.
"All Over"	2017	—	—	—	—	—	Sugarcane
"Ma Lo" (with Wizkid and Spellz)	2017	—	—	—	—	13	Sugarcane
"Get It Now" (Remix) (featuring Omarion)	2018	—	—	—	—		Non-album singles
"Tiwa's Vibe"	2018	—	—	—	—		Non-album singles
"Labalaba"	2018	—	—	—	—		Non-album singles
"Lova Lova" (featuring Duncan Mighty)	2018	—	—	—	—	11	Non-album singles
"One"	2018	—	—	—	—		Non-album singles
"49-99"	2019	—	—	—	—	9	Non-album singles
"Owo Mi Da"	2019	—	—	—	—	—	Non-album singles
"Attention"	2019	1	—	—	—		Celia
"Dangerous Love"	2020	—	12	—	—	—	Celia
"Koroba"	2020	—	10	—	—	24	Celia
"Temptation" (with Sam Smith)	2020	—	4	—	—	14	Celia
"Tales by Moonlight" (featuring Amaarae)	2021	—	19	—	—	—	Water & Garri
"Somebody's Son" (featuring Brandy)	2021	6	6	—	42	11	Water & Garri
"Jaiye Foreign" (with Zinoleesky)	2022	8	15	—	18	—	Non-album singles
"Koo Koo Fun" (with Major Lazer, Major League DJz, and DJ Maphorisa)	2022	—	—	—	—	—	Non-album singles
"Loaded" (with Asake)	2022	3	4	—	15	—	Where We Come From, Vol. 01
"Stamina" (with Ayra Starr and Young Jonn)	2023	3	2	—	16	—	Non-album singles
"Pick Up"	2023	20	15	—	—	—	Non-album singles
"Lost Time"	2024	—	—	—	—	—	Water & Garri (Original Motion Picture Soundtrack)
"Forgiveness"	2024	—	—	—	—	—	Non-album singles
"Mega Money Mega"	2024	—	—	—	—	—	Non-album singles
"Commitment" (with Craig David)	2025	—	—	51	—	—	Commitment
"You4Me"	2025	—	16	—	—	—	This One is Personal
"On the Low" (with Skepta)	2025	52	10	—	—	—	This One is Personal

=== As featured artist ===
List of singles as featured artist, with selected chart positions
Title	Year	Peak chart positions			Certifications	Album
Title	Year	NGR	US Afro.	US World	Certifications	Album
"Champion Love" (Tosin Martins featuring Tiwa Savage)	2011	—	—	—		I'm a M.E.S
"Beremole" (Adey featuring Tiwa Savage)	2012	—	—	—		Non-album singles
"Oyi" (Remix) (Flavour featuring Tiwa Savage)	2012	—	—	—		Non-album singles
"Darlin" (Stan Iyke featuring Tiwa Savage)	2012	—	—	—		Non-album singles
"God Sent" (Jaywon featuring Tiwa Savage)	2013	—	—	—		Non-album singles
"Ordinary Love" (Sarkodie featuring Tiwa Savage)	2013	—	—	—		Sarkology
"Turn It Up" (Reekado Banks featuring Tiwa Savage)	2014	—	—	—		Non-album singles
"Dorobucci" (with Don Jazzy, Dr SID, D’Prince, Reekado Banks, Korede Bello, and Di’ja)	2014	—	—	—		Non-album singles
"Girlie 'O'" (Remix) (Patoranking featuring Tiwa Savage)	2014	—	—	—		Non-album singles
"Onye" (Waje featuring Tiwa Savage)	2014	—	—	—		W.A.J.E
"Ife" (Pasuma featuring Tiwa Savage)	2014	—	—	—		My World
"Baby Jollof" (Solidstar featuring Tiwa Savage)	2014	—	—	—		Non-album singles
"Looku Looku" (Mavins featuring Don Jazzy, Tiwa Savage, Dr Sid, D'Prince, Di'ja, Reekado Banks, and Korede Bello)	2014	—	—	—		Non-album singles
"I No Dey Lie" (Presh featuring Tiwa Savage)	2014	—	—	—		Non-album singles
"Alive" (Bracket featuring Diamond Platnumz and Tiwa Savage)	2014	—	—	—		Alive
"Gbemileke" (Remix) (Skuki featuring Tiwa Savage)	2015	—	—	—		Non-album singles
"Woju" (Remix) (Kiss Daniel featuring Tiwa Savage and Davido)	2015	—	—	—		Non-album singles
"Just Incase" (Isaac Geraldds featuring Tiwa Savage)	2015	—	—	—		Non-album singles
"Jantamanta" (Mavins featuring Don Jazzy, Tiwa Savage, Dr Sid, D'Prince, Reekado Banks, Korede Bello, and Di'ja)	2015	—	—	—		Non-album singles
"Romantic" (Korede Bello featuring Tiwa Savage)	2015	—	—	—		Belloved
"Wait (Refix)" (Solidstar featuring Tiwa Savage and Patoranking)	2016	—	—	—		W.E.E.D.
"Ase" (Pepenazi featuring Tiwa Savage and Masterkraft)	2017	—	—	—		My Coat of Many Colours
"Rain Drops" (Donald featuring Tiwa Savage)	2017	—	—	—		Something More
"Fire" (Diamond Platnumz featuring Tiwa Savage)	2017	—	—	—		A Boy from Tandale
"Esopi Yo" (Awilo Longomba featuring Tiwa Savage)	2017	—	—	—		Non-album single
"Informate" (DJ Kaywise featuring Tiwa Savage)	2017	—	—	—		Non-album single
"Anything (For You)" (DJ Big N featuring Tiwa Savage and Burna Boy)	2017	—	—	—		Non-album single
"Me and You" (Emtee featuring Tiwa Savage)	2017	—	—	—	RISA: Gold	Manando
"Pose" (DJ Xclusive featuring Tiwa Savage and Solidstar)	2017	—	—	—		Non-album singles
"Are You Down" (Ladipoe featuring Tiwa Savage)	2017	—	—	—		Non-album singles
"Like" (Reekado Banks featuring Tiwa Savage and Fiokee)	2017	—	—	—		Non-album singles
"Girl Next Door" (Sauti Sol featuring Tiwa Savage)	2018	—	—	—		Afrikan Sauce
"Love Struck" (WSTRN featuring Tiwa Savage and Mr Eazi)	2018	—	—	—		Double 3ak
"Do Like This" (DJ Consquence featuring Tiwa Savage and Mystro)	2018	—	—	—		Non-album singles
"Shake It" (D'Banj featuring Tiwa Savage)	2018	—	—	—		Non-album singles
"Voodoo" (Stargate and Los Unidades featuring Tiwa Savage, Wizkid, Danny Ocean, and David Guetta)	2018	—	—	—		Global Citizen – EP 1
"Shotan" (Zlatan featuring Tiwa Savage)	2019	—	—	—		Zanku
"Dis Love" (DJ Spinall featuring Tiwa Savage and Wizkid)	2019	—	—	—		Grace
"Your Love (Mogbe)" (BOJ featuring Tiwa Savage)	2019	—	—	—		Gbagada Express
"Let Them Know" (Young Jonn featuring Tiwa Savage and Joeboy)	2020	—	—	—		Non-album single
"Gobe" (Remix) (L.A.X featuring Tiwa Savage and Simi)	2020	—	—	—		ZaZa Vibes
"The One" (Efya featuring Tiwa Savage)	2020	—	—	—		Non-album single
"Gal Policy" (Remix) (Kranium featuring Tiwa Savage)	2020	—	—	—		Non-album single
"Speak to Me" (Reekado Banks featuring Tiwa Savage)	2021	—	—	—		Off the Record
"BBC" (Remix) (Blaqbonez featuring Tiwa Savage)	2021	—	—	—		Sex Over Love
"Can't Let You Go" (Remix) (Stefflon Don featuring Tiwa Savage and Rema)	2021	—	—	—		Non-album singles
"No Wahala" (Remix) (1da Banton featuring Kizz Daniel and Tiwa Savage)	2022	—	—	—	TCSN: Platinum	Non-album singles
"All Day" (Waje featuring Tiwa Savage)	2022	—	—	—		Waje 2.0
"Gbese" (Majeeed featuring Tiwa Savage)	2023	38	—	—		Non-album single
"Fan" (Blaq Jerzee featuring Tiwa Savage)	2023	—	—	—		Lost Files
"Who Is Your Guy?" (Remix) (Spyro featuring Tiwa Savage)	2023	2	—	—	TCSN: Platinum	Non-album singles
"NSV" (Bella Shmurda featuring Tiwa Savage)	2023	23	—	—		Non-album singles
"Roll on Me" (Lavaud featuring Tiwa Savage, Patoranking, Reekado Banks, and Kanis)	2023	—	12	4		Non-album singles
"Terminator" (King Promise featuring Sean Paul and Tiwa Savage)	2023	6	—	—		Non-album singles
"Men Are Crazy" (Simi featuring Tiwa Savage)	2024	—	41	—		Lost and Found
"In My Head" (Timaya featuring Tiwa Savage)	2024	—	—	—		Gladiator
"100 Million" (Odumodublvck featuring Tiwa Savage)	2024	—	24	—		Non-album singles
"Awolowo" (Remix) (Fido featuring Tiwa Savage)	2024	—	—	—		Non-album singles
"Toma Toma" (Ruger featuring Tiwa Savage)	2024	3	17	—		Blownboy Ru
"Over the Moon" (Johnny Drille featuring Tiwa Savage)	2025	—	—	—		Non-album single

=== Promotional singles ===
List of promotional singles, with selected details
Title	Year	Album
"Head to My Heart"	2009	Non-album singles
"What Do I Do"	2011	Non-album singles
"Toast to the Good Life" (with Banky W. and eLDee)	2011	Hennessy Artistry
"Let's Get This Party Started" (with Wizkid, 2Face Idibia, D'banj, and M.I)	2012	Non-album singles
"His Voice"	2013	Non-album singles
"Surulere (Tiwa Savage remix)" (Dr Sid featuring Don Jazzy, Wizkid, Phyno, and Tiwa Savage)	2014	Non-album singles
"Africa Rising" (with Davido, Lola Rae, Sarkodie, Diamond Platnumz, and Mi Casa)	2014	Non-album singles
"Colors of Love"	2014	Non-album singles
"Get It Together" (with Rudeboy)	2016	Non-album singles
"One Heart (Can Change The World)"	2024	Non-album singles

== Covers and freestyles ==
List of covers and freestyles
Title	Year
"Oyi (Tiwa Remix)"	2012
"Beneath Your Beautiful" (cover) (with Dr Sid)	2013
"Fvck You" (cover)	2019

== Guest appearances ==
List of non-single guest appearances, with other performing artists, showing year released and album name
Title	Year	Other artist(s)	Album
"Do As I Do"	2011	P-Square, May D	The Invasion
"Everything"	2011	9ice	Versus
"Ife"	2012	D'Prince	Frenzy!
"International Local"	2012	Olamide	YBNL
"Somebody"	2013	Iyanya	Desire
"Oyari"	2013	Dr Sid	Siduction
"Alhaji"	2015	DJ Xclusive, Reekado Banks, Trafic	According to X
"Proper"	2016	Anatii	Artiifact
"No Be Today"	2016	Ice Prince	Jos to the World
"Spy Candy"	2017	Jidenna	Boomerang
"Fine Fine Girls"	2017	Olamide	Lagos Nawa
"The Way You Are (Gbadun You)"	2017	Di'ja	Aphrodija
"Attracta"	2018	Humblesmith	Osinachi
"Gbemisoke"	2018	CDQ	Ibile Mugabe
"My Type" (Remix)	2019	Saweetie, French Montana, Wale	My Type (The Remixes)
"Ginger"	2020	2Baba	Warriors
"Eja Osan"	2020	Reminisce	Vibes & Insha Allah
"Balance"	2020	Maleek Berry	Isolation Room
"Matter"	2020	Patoranking	Three
"Tanana"	2020	Davido	A Better Time
"African Sugar"	2020	Tayc	Fleur froide
"Top Shelf"	2021	Chip	Snakers & Ladders
"I Do"	2021	Mr. P	The Prodigal
"Matrimony"	2021	Peruzzi	Rum & Boogie
"Let Dem Kno"	2021	Smallgod, Kwesi Arthur	Building Bridges
"Bankroll"	2021	Not3s, Avelino	3 Th3 Album
"Hold Me"	2022	Dice Ailes	Ladies First
"Beautiful Sunflower"	2022	Falz	Before the Feast
"Therapy 2.0"	2023	Stonebwoy, Oxlade	5th Dimension
"Bomzão"	2023	Iza	Afrodhit
"One Time"	2024	Nasty C, Lekaa Beats	Confuse The Enemy (Reloaded)
"Repay Your Part"	2024	Vector	Teslim: A Lover Boy PTSD
"4 My Body"	2025	Maleek Berry	If Only Love Was Enough

== Cameo appearances ==
Title	Year	Director(s)
"Over the Moon" (Dr Sid)	2010	DJ Tee
"Pakurumo" (Wizkid)	2011	Clarence Peters
"Fever" (Wizkid)	2018	Meji Alabi

== Music videos ==
=== As lead artist ===
List of music videos as lead artist, showing date released and directors
Title	Year	Director(s)	Ref.
"Kele Kele Love"	2010	Jerry Chan	
"Love Me, Love Me, Love Me"	2011	Sesan	
"Toast to the Good Life" (with Banky W. and eLDee)	2011	GINI	
"Let's Get This Party Started" (with Wizkid, 2Face Idibia, D'banj, and M.I)	2012	Clarence Peters	
"Ife Wa Gbona" (featuring Leo Wonder)	2012	Bolaji Kekere-Ekun	
"Without My Heart" (featuring Don Jazzy)	2013	Mark Hofmeyr	
"Olorun Mi"	2013	George Guise	
"Eminado" (featuring Don Jazzy)	2013	Clarence Peters	
"Wanted"	2014	Moe Musa	
"Africa Rising" (with Davido, Lola Rae, Sarkodie, Diamond Platnumz, and Mi Casa)	2014	CallBack Dreams	
"My Darlin"	2014	Kemi Adetiba	
"African Waist" (featuring Don Jazzy)	2015	—	
"Standing Ovation" (featuring Olamide)	2016	Clarence Peters	
"If I Start to Talk" (featuring Dr Sid)	2016	Clarence Peters	
"Bad" (featuring Wizkid)	2016	Sesan	
"Key to the City" (Remix) (featuring Busy Signal)	2016	Moe Musa	
"Rewind"	2016	Clarence Peters	
"All Over"	2017	Patrick Elis	
"Ma Lo" (featuring Wizkid)	2017	Meji Alabi	
"Sugarcane"	2017	Meji Alabi	
"Get It Now"	2018	Meji Alabi	
"Get It Now" (Remix) (featuring Omarion)	2018	Meji Alabi	
"Tiwa's Vibe"	2018	Clarence Peters	
"Lova Lova" (featuring Duncan Mighty)	2018	Clarence Peters	
"One"	2018	Clarence Peters	
"49-99"	2019	Meji Alabi	
"Dangerous Love"	2020	Ibra and Tiwa Savage	
"Koroba"	2020	Clarence Peters	
"Ole" (featuring Naira Marley)	2020	Clarence Peters	
"Park Well" (featuring Davido)	2020	Director K	
"Somebody's Son" (featuring Brandy)	2021	Meji Alabi	
"Tales by Moonlight" (featuring Amaarae)	2021	Meji Alabi	
"Loaded" (with Asake)	2022	TG Omori	
"Stamina" (with Ayra Starr and Young Jonn)	2023	Clarence Peters	
"Pick Up"	2023	—	
"Commona" (featuring Olamide and Mystro)	2024	Jyde Ajala	
"One Heart (Can Change The World)"	2024	—	
"Forgiveness"	2024	Director Pink	
"Mega Money Mega"	2024	Moe Musa	
"You4Me"	2025	Liam S. Gleeson	
"On the Low" (featuring Skepta)	2025	Mack Quicke	

=== As featured artist ===
List of music videos as featured artist, showing date released and directors
Title	Video release date	Director(s)	Ref
"Oyi Remix" (Flavour featuring Tiwa Savage)	February 18, 2012	Godfather Productions	
"Girlie O (Remix)" (Patoranking featuring Tiwa Savage)	May 20, 2014	Moe Musa	
"Who is Your Guy? (Remix)" (Spyro featuring Tiwa Savage)	March 3, 2021	Tairiebi Joel	
