= List of awards and nominations received by Tiwa Savage =

Tiwa Savage awards and nominations
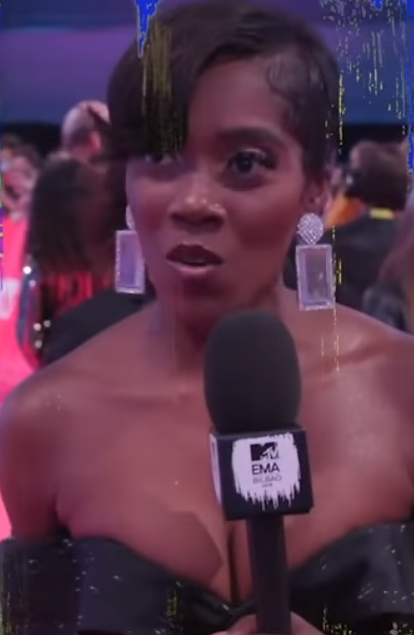
- Tiwa attending the 2018 MTV Europe Music Awards
Awards and nominations
Award	Wins	Nominations
BET	0	1
MTV Europe	1	1
NAACP Image Awards	0	2
AFRIMA	3	3

This is a list of major music awards and nominations received by Nigerian singer Tiwa Savage.

== Awards table ==
Year	Event	Prize	Recipient	Result	Ref
2027	Headies Awards	Best Female Ariste	Herself	Pending	
2027	Headies Awards	This One is Personal	Album of the Year	Pending	
2027	Headies Awards	This One is Personal	Best R&B Album	Pending	
2027	Headies Awards	"You4Me"	Best Vocal Performance (Female)	Pending	
2027	Headies Awards	"You4Me"	Best R&B Single	Pending	
2022	AFRIMA 2022	Artiste of the Year	"Somebody's Son" – Tiwa Savage (ft. Brandy)	Nominated	
2022	AFRIMA 2022	Best African Collaboration	"Somebody's Son" – Tiwa Savage (ft. Brandy)	Nominated	
2022	AFRIMA 2022	Best Female Artiste in West Africa	"Somebody's Son" – Tiwa Savage (ft. Brandy)	Nominated	
2022	AFRIMA 2022	Best Artiste/Duo/Group in African R&B/Soul	"Tales by Moonlight" (ft. Amaarae)	Nominated	
2022	The Headies 2022	Best Recording of the Year	"Somebody's Son" – Tiwa Savage (ft. Brandy)	Nominated	
2022	The Headies 2022	Best R&B Album	Water and Garri	Nominated	
2022	The Headies 2022	Best Female Artist	Herself	Nominated	
2021	Net Honours	Most Popular Musician	Herself	Nominated	
2021	Net Honours	Most Searched Musician (female)	Herself	Nominated	
2021	MTV Africa Music Awards	Best Female Act	Herself	Nominated	
2021	MTV Africa Music Awards	Artist of the Year	Herself	Nominated	
2021	MTV Africa Music Awards	Listener's Choice	Herself	Nominated	
2021	NAACP Image Awards	Outstanding International Song	"Tanana" (featuring Davido)	Nominated	
2021	NAACP Image Awards	Outstanding International Song	"Temptation"	Nominated	
2020	Soundcity MVP Awards	Best Female MVP	Herself	Nominated	
2020	Soundcity MVP Awards	Viewers' Choice	"49-99"	Nominated	
2020	Soundcity MVP Awards	African Video of the Year	"49-99"	Won	
2020	Soundcity MVP Awards	African Artiste of the Year	Herself	Nominated	
2019	AFRIMA	Best Female West Africa	Herself	Won	
2018	AFRIMA	Best Female West Africa	Herself	Won	
2018	MTV Europe Music Awards	Best African Act	Tiwa Savage	Won	
2018	Nigerian Entertainment Awards (NEA)	Afropop Female Artist	Herself	Nominated	
2017	AFRIMA	Best Female West Africa	Herself	Won	
2016	WatsUp TV Africa Music Video Awards	African Video of the Year	"Bad"	Nominated	
2016	WatsUp TV Africa Music Video Awards	Best African Female Video	"Bad"	Nominated	
2016	WatsUp TV Africa Music Video Awards	Best West African Video	"Bad"	Nominated	
2016	WatsUp TV Africa Music Video Awards	Best African Performance	Herself - One Africa Music Fest 2016	Nominated	
2015	Vodafone Ghana Music Awards	African Artiste of the Year	Herself	Nominated	
2015	City People Awards	Artiste of the Year(Female)	Herself	Nominated	
2015	COSON Song Awards	Best Love Song	"My Darlin"	Nominated	
2015	COSON Song Awards	Best Collabo Song	"Girlie O (Remix)"	Won	
2014	ELOY Awards	Best Female Artist	"Wanted"	Nominated	
2014	ELOY Awards	Best Brand Ambassador	Tiwa Savage for MTN	Nominated	
2014	The Headies 2014	Hip Hop World Revelation of the Year	Herself	Nominated	
2014	The Headies 2014	Artiste of the Year	Herself	Nominated	
2014	The Headies 2014	Best Vocal Performance (Female)	Tiwa Savage for "Wanted"	Nominated	
2014	The Headies 2014	Best R&B/Pop Album	Once Upon a Time	Nominated	
2014	The Headies 2014	Best Collabo	"Girlie O Remix" (Patoranking featuring Tiwa Savage)	Nominated	
2014	The Headies 2014	Best Reggae/Dancehall Single	"Girlie O Remix" (Patoranking featuring Tiwa Savage)	Won	
2014	2014 Channel O Music Video Awards	Most Gifted Female	"Eminado" (featuring Don Jazzy)	Won	
2014	2014 Channel O Music Video Awards	Most Gifted Video of the Year	"Eminado" (featuring Don Jazzy)	Nominated	
2014	MOBO Awards	Best African Act	Herself	Nominated	
2014	2014 Nigeria Entertainment Awards	Female Artist of the Year	Herself	Won	
2014	2014 Nigeria Entertainment Awards	Best Pop/R&B Artist of the Year	Herself	Won	
2014	2014 Nigeria Entertainment Awards	Best Album of the Year	Once Upon a Time	Nominated	
2014	2014 Nigeria Entertainment Awards	Hottest Single of the Year	"Eminado" (featuring Don Jazzy)	Nominated	
2014	2014 Nigeria Entertainment Awards	Best Music Video of the Year (Artist & Director)	"Eminado" (featuring Don Jazzy) (Note: The Best Music Video of the Year accolade was awarded to both Savage and Clarence Peters.)	Nominated	
2014	African Muzik Magazine Awards	Best Female West Africa	Herself	Won	
2014	City People Entertainment Awards	Musician of The Year (Female)	Herself	Won	
2014	BET Awards 2014	Best International Act: Africa	Herself	Nominated	
2014	MTV Africa Music Awards 2014	Best Female	Herself	Won	
2014	World Music Awards	World's Best Song	"Eminado" (featuring Don Jazzy)	Nominated	
2014	World Music Awards	World's Best Video	"Eminado" (featuring Don Jazzy)	Nominated	
2014	World Music Awards	World's Best Female Artist	Herself	Nominated	
2014	World Music Awards	World's Best Live Act	Herself	Nominated	
2014	World Music Awards	World's Best Entertainer of the Year	Herself	Nominated	
2013	Nigeria Music Video Awards (NMVA)	Best Use of Costumes	"Without My Heart" (featuring Don Jazzy)	Nominated	
2013	Nigeria Entertainment Awards	Best Collabo	"Without My Heart" (featuring Don Jazzy)	Nominated	
2013	Channel O Music Video Awards	Most Gifted Female Video	"Without My Heart" (featuring Don Jazzy)	Nominated	
2013	4Syte TV Music Video Awards	Best African Act Video	"Without My Heart" (featuring Don Jazzy)	Nominated	
2013	MOBO Awards	Best African Act	Herself	Nominated	
2013	City People Entertainment Awards	Musician of the Year (Female)	Herself	Nominated	
2013	City People Entertainment Awards	Best Collabo of the Year	"Without My Heart" (featuring Don Jazzy)	Nominated	
2012	Nigeria Music Video Awards (NMVA)	Best Use of Costumes	"Ife Wa Gbona"	Nominated	
2012	Nigeria Music Video Awards (NMVA)	Best Highlife	"Ife Wa Gbona"	Won	
2012	Nigeria Music Video Awards (NMVA)	Best Indigenous Concept	"Ife Wa Gbona"	Nominated	
2012	Nigeria Music Video Awards (NMVA)	Video of the Year	"Ife Wa Gbona"	Nominated	
2012	Nigeria Entertainment Awards	Best New Act of the Year	Herself	Nominated	
2012	Nigeria Entertainment Awards	Best Pop/R&B Artist of the Year	Herself	Nominated	
2012	The Headies	Best Vocal Performance (Female)	"Love Me (3x)"	Won	
2012	The Headies	Best R 'N’ B Single	"Love Me (3x)"	Nominated	
2012	Channel O Music Video Awards	Most Gifted R&B Music Video of the Year	"Oyi (Remix)" (Flavour N'abania featuring Tiwa Savage)	Won	
2011	Nigeria Entertainment Awards	Best New Act of the Year	Herself	Nominated	
2011	Nigeria Music Video Awards (NMVA)	Best Use of Choreography	"Kele Kele Love"	Nominated	
2011	City People Entertainment Awards	Female Musician of the Year	Herself	Won	
2011	Afrotainment Museke Online Music Awards	Best R&B Soul Song	"Kele Kele Love"	Won	
2011	FAB Magazine Awards	Most Stylish Female Artiste	Herself	Won	
2011	Dynamix All Youth Awards	Most Promising Act	Herself	Won	
2011	Channel O Music Video Awards	Most Gifted Female Video	"Kele Kele Love"	Nominated	
2011	Tush Youth Awards	Female Musician of the Year	Herself	Nominated	
2011	Tush Youth Awards	Song of the Year	"Love Me (3x)"	Nominated	
2011	The Headies	Next Rated	"Kele Kele Love"	Nominated	
2010	Dynamix All Youth Awards	Promising Artiste of the Year	Herself	Nominated	
