= Adesuwa Aighewi =

American fashion model and filmmaker

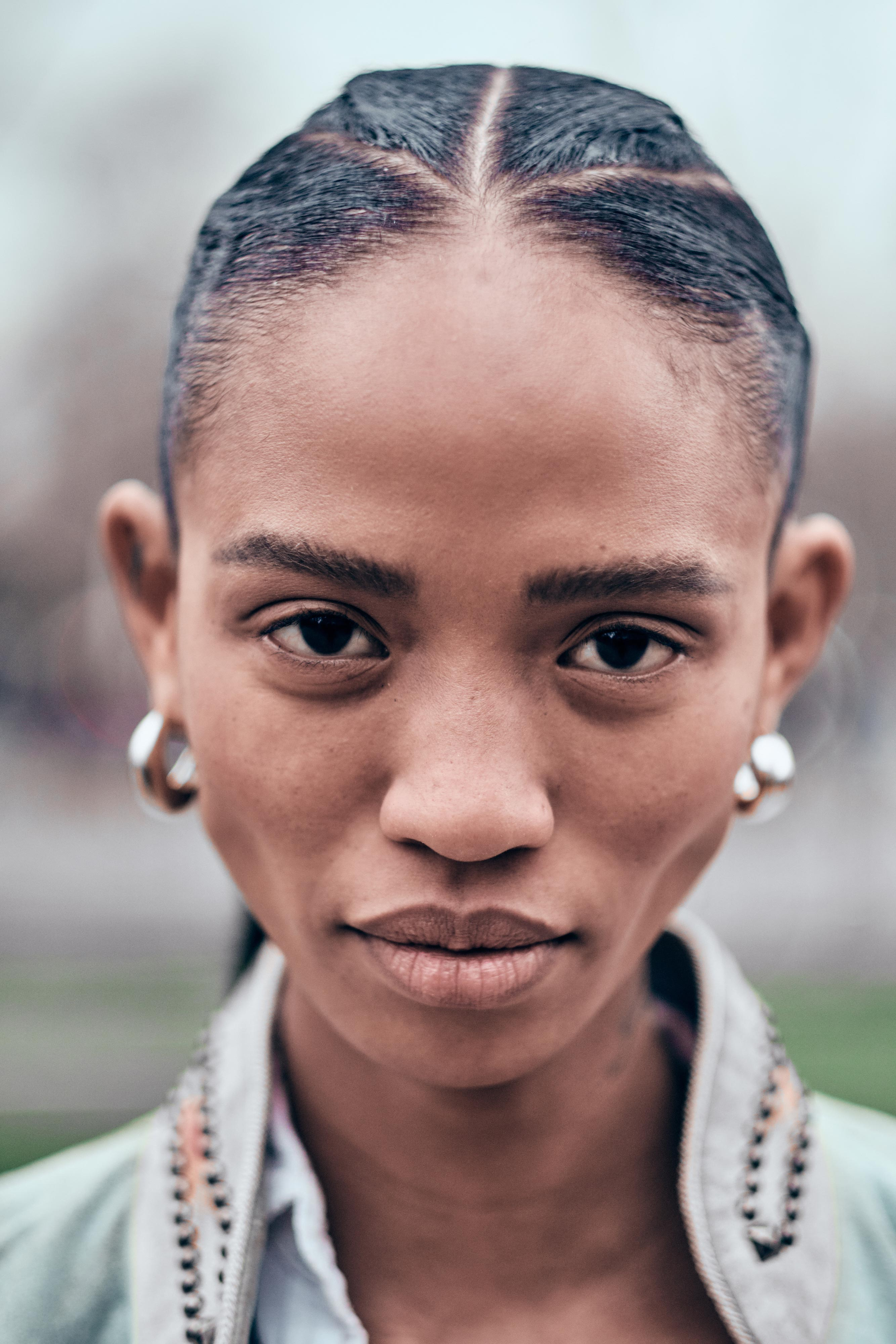
- Aighewi in 2019
- Born: Adesuwa Thongpond Pariyasapat Aighewi; April 22, 1988 (age 38); Minneapolis, Minnesota, U.S.
- Education: University of Maryland Eastern Shore
- Modeling information
- Height: 1.78 m (5 ft 10 in)
- Hair color: Brown
- Eye color: Brown
- Agency: The Society Management (New York); Elite Model Management (Paris, Milan); Premier Model Management (London); Uno Models (Barcelona); Le Management (Copenhagen, Hamburg); Photogenics LA (Los Angeles); Stockholmsgruppen (Stockholm)

Adesuwa Thongpond Pariyasapat Aighewi (born April 22, 1988) is an American fashion model and filmmaker. In 2018, she was chosen as the runner up for "Breakout Star of the Year" by models.com. As of January 2019, Aighewi ranks as one of the "Top 50" models by models.com.

== Early life ==
Adesuwa Aighewi was born on April 22, 1988 in Minnesota to a Thai-born Chinese mother and a Nigerian father. Before modeling she was a chemistry student at the University of Maryland Eastern Shore where she started attending at age 15. She once interned for NASA. As her parents are environmental scientists, she moved frequently and spent half of her childhood in Nigeria.

== Career ==
Aighewi was discovered on the campus of the University of Maryland Eastern Shore. She has walked for Alexander Wang, Coach, Louis Vuitton, Chanel, Kenzo, Kate Spade, Miu Miu, Bottega Veneta, Marc Jacobs, Yeezy, Michael Kors, Prabal Gurung, Christian Dior, Fendi, and Tommy Hilfiger among others. She has appeared in advertisements for Tom Ford, Marc Jacobs, Vera Wang, and Chanel. Adesuwa's break out video "Spring in Harlem" debuted on LOVE.com and was written up by Forbes.

== Videography ==
Year	Title	Artist	Role
2011	"Bonfire"	Childish Gambino	Camper
2012	"Heartbeat"	Childish Gambino	Girlfriend
2016	"Woman"	Diana Gordon	Model
2020	"Dangerous Love"	Tiwa Savage	Videocaller
