= Water and Garri =

Nigerian Film

Water and Garri is a 2024 Nigerian film. It was directed by Meji Alabi and shot in Cape Coast, Ghana. The film derived its name from Tiwa Savage's EP of the same name.

== Reception ==
Stephen Onu of Premium Times rated the film 4/10, citing its poor directing.
