= Jay Sankey =

Canadian magician

Jay Sankey is a Canadian close-up magician and a prolific creator of magic effects. He has been an active stage performer since the mid-1980s.

== Work ==
He is known as a stand-up comedian and authored a book about the art of stand-up, Zen and the Art of Stand-Up Comedy in 1999. However, he is best known for the many magical effects which he has published to help magicians develop their craft. His most well known works include his "Revolutionary Coin Magic" and "Revolutionary Card Magic" DVDs.

In 2009, Sankey announced that Andi Gladwin and Joshua Jay were in the process of writing his complete works in a trilogy of books. In 2012 The Definitive Sankey volumes 1–3 were released in both a regular edition three book and a single DVD format and a deluxe version which has an extra DVD and is signed by Jay.

Sankey's website reflects his extraordinarily large contribution of magical effects to the magic industry with this statement: "Jay also holds the world's record for creating more original illusions than any other living magician."

== Effects performed by other magicians ==
David Copperfield performed Sankey's card in balloon effect.

Sankey developed effects for Criss Angel for less than a year before leaving the program. Sankey now produces humorous videos of himself in the persona of "Craigg Angelo."

== Appearances ==
Sankey is featured in Spellz, a TVO Kids program that he co-hosts with Bridget Hall, co-produced by David Peck. He also performed in the second season of Penn & Teller: Fool Us (Episode 6, "Now THAT'S Bunny!", 10 August 2015).

== Awards ==
In 2007 Jay won 3rd place in Edd Withers' The Magic Woods Awards for Best Book: for the book Beyond Secrets. He has authored numerous books on comedy and magic, and has produced and appeared in numerous instructional videos intended for magicians and other stage performers.

== Private life ==
Jay lives in Toronto with his wife Sonia. He has two children.

== See also ==
- List of magicians
