= R.E.D (Tiwa Savage album) =

Studio album by Tiwa Savage
- Released: December 19, 2015
- Recorded: 2013–2015
- Genres: Afropop; reggae; dancehall; pop
- Length: 60:00
- Labels: Mavin Records; 323 Entertainment
- Producers: Spellz; Baby Fresh; Altims; P2J

Tiwa Savage chronology
Once Upon a Time (2013)	R.E.D (2015)	Sugarcane (2017)

Singles from R.E.D
- 1. "My Darlin" Released: October 8, 2014; 2. "Standing Ovation" Released: January 14, 2016

R.E.D (an acronym for Romance, Expression and Dance) is the second studio album by Nigerian singer Tiwa Savage. It was released on December 19, 2015, by Mavin Records and 323 Entertainment. The album features guest appearances from Don Jazzy, Olamide, Dr SID, Iceberg Slim, 2face Idibia, D'Prince, Busy Signal and Reekado Banks. It was primarily produced by Don Jazzy, along with additional production from Baby Fresh, Altims, Spellz and P2J. R.E.D was supported by the singles "My Darlin" and "Standing Ovation". Its deluxe edition was released in February 2016, and features collaborations with Wizkid and P-Square. R.E.D was nominated for Best Album at the 2016 Nigeria Entertainment Awards.

== Background and promotion ==
R.E.D is an acronym for Romance, Expression and Dance. It revolves around themes of sex, love and religious tropes. Savage recorded the album while pregnant with her son. R.E.D was made available for free digital streaming on MTN Music, and was reportedly intended for release on December 21, 2015. Within 24 hours of its release, it became the most-streamed album of all time on MTN Music. Mavin Records promoted the album by launching a meme generator through the website i-am-red.com. The website's interface allowed users to create a meme by uploading their pictures and entering values for the R.E.D acronym. Users had the option to enter text in the fields or choose from pre-defined suggestions. They were also encouraged to share their images on social media sites with the #IamRED hashtag.

While promoting the album in London, Savage stopped by BBC Africa's London Studio and spoke to Bola Mosuro about the project. She held a listening party at an Industry Nite event and performed all of the songs on the album. She also unveiled the album's cover art and narrated stories about each song on it. Guest in attendance included Fade Ogunro, Don Jazzy, Dr SID, D'Prince, Di'Ja, Korede Bello, Waje, 9ice, Tomi Odunsi, MC Galaxy and Iceberg Slim.

=== Singles and other releases ===
"My Darlin" was released as the album's lead single on October 8, 2014. It was jointly produced by Don Jazzy and Baby Fresh. The accompanying music video for "My Darlin" was directed by Kemi Adetiba. In the video's opening scene, Savage plays the role of an older woman who jokes about a wedding party in a room full of bridesmaids. The video also depicts images of Savage's wedding gown and a non-linear portrait of a loving yet tragic relationship. The Olamide-assisted track "Standing Ovation" was released on January 14, 2016, as the album's second single. Its accompanying music video was filmed by Clarence Peters.

A carnival-themed music video for "African Waist" was recorded in South Africa and released in December 2015. In the video, Don Jazzy plays the role of a fitness instructor. Pulse Nigeria's Princess Abumere described the song as a "cheerful fusion of soul calypso and afrobeat". The Peters-directed video for "If I Start to Talk" was released in April 2016. A teaser clip of the video was released the previous day. Tope Delano of TooXclusive said the song is a "deeply personal and raw account of Tiwa's life story". The music video for the Wizkid-assisted track "Bad" was released in July 2016, a day after the confirmation of Savage's Roc Nation deal. It was directed by Sesan Ogunro and features cameo appearances from Banky W, Funke Akindele and Denrele Edun. In the video, Wizkid and Savage are seen putting up graffiti on the wall. The accompanying video for "Rewind" was recorded by Peters and released in October 2016. Nigerian actor Emmanuel Ikubuese plays Savage's love interest in the video.

== Composition ==
In the fuji-inspired street anthem "Standing Ovation", Savage appears tough and plays up her credibility. In "Adura", Don Jazzy channels Ebenezer Obey and incorporates drums and bass-guitar melodies. The secular track "African Waist" contains elements of Afro-Caribbean music and dubstep; its production features full horns, muted-trumpet solos and saxophone riffs. Echezonachukwu Nduka of Praxis Magazine said the song is "experimental in both rhythmic and vocal delivery". "We Don't Give a Damn" is composed of martial-like band music and muted trumpet riffs. "Rewind" has elements of Middle Eastern music, while the Dr SID-assisted track "If I Start to Talk" is grounded in Afrobeat. "Make time" is reminiscent of reggae music from the 1980s.

The dancehall pop track "Key to the City" features vocals by Jamaican singer Busy Signal. The emotional track "Bang Bang" has been described as the classic romance template in microcosm. The Reekado Banks-assisted track "Go Down" is thematically about oral sex. In "Love Me Hard", 2Baba reworked a line from his Grass 2 Grace album. In the D'Prince-assisted track "Before Nko", Savage brags about her sexual drive. Nduka criticized the song for appropriating Faze's "Need Somebody".

== Critical reception ==
Professional ratings
Review scores
Source	Rating
Pulse Nigeria	4/5 stars

R.E.D received mixed reviews from music critics. In a review for 360nobs, Wilfred Okiche characterized the album as "a basic Nigerian pop record" despite it boasting "an interesting concept driven title". Okiche also opined that Savage is more grounded on the album and knows who her target audiences are. Writing for Pulse Nigeria, Joey Akan described the album as a "singer-songwriter's album through and through" and said it is "personal and organic, fresh and contemporary without being beholden to conformist radio sounds".

Reviewing for Music in Africa, Oris Aigbokhaevbolo praised Savage for "producing an album deserving of the attention she craves", but cited the unevenness of the songwriting as its weakness. Ade Tayo of Simply African Music said R.E.D is quite inferior to Once Upon a Time from a direction and cohesive standpoint. Praxis Magazine's Echezonachukwu Nduka praised the album for staying true to its themes, but ended the review saying the "high presence of featured artistes robs her of full credits".

=== Accolades ===
Year	Awards ceremony	Award description(s)	Results
2016	Nigeria Entertainment Awards	Best Album	Nominated

== Track listing ==
No.	Title	Writer(s)	Producer(s)	Length
1.	"Adura"	Tiwatope Savage	Don Jazzy	3:25
2.	"African Waist" (featuring Don Jazzy)	Savage; Michael Collins Ajereh	Don Jazzy	4:16
3.	"Standing Ovation" (featuring Olamide)	Savage; Olamide Adedeji	Don Jazzy	3:12
4.	"Rewind"	Savage	Baby Fresh	3:08
5.	"If I Start to Talk" (featuring Dr SID)	Savage; Sidney Onoriode Esiri	Don Jazzy	3:54
6.	"Make Time" (featuring Iceberg Slim)	Savage; Olusegun Olowokere	Don Jazzy	4:14
7.	"Bang Bang"	Savage	Don Jazzy	4:18
8.	"Love Me Hard" (featuring 2face Idibia)	Savage; Innocent Idibia	P2J	4:15
9.	"Before Nko" (featuring D'Prince)	Savage; Charles Enebeli	Altims	3:47
10.	"We Don't Give a Damn"	Savage	Don Jazzy	3:46
11.	"Kolobi"	Savage	Don Jazzy	2:35
12.	"Key to the City" (featuring Busy Signal)	Savage; Glendale Goshia Gordon	Spellz	4:02
13.	"Say It"	Savage	Don Jazzy	3:25
14.	"My Darlin'"	Savage	Baby Fresh; Don Jazzy	4:10
15.	"Go Down" (featuring Reekado Banks)	Savage; Ayoleyi Hanniel Solomon	Don Jazzy	2:55
16.	"Birthday"	Savage	Don Jazzy	3:42
Total length:				60:00

R.E.D – Deluxe edition
No.	Title	Writer(s)	Producer(s)	Length
17.	"Bad" (featuring Wizkid)	Savage; Ayodeji Balogun	P2J	4:10
18.	"Bang Bang (Remix)" (featuring P-Square)	Savage; Paul and Peter Okoye	Don Jazzy	5:33
Total length:				68:00

== Personnel ==
- Tiwatope Savage – primary artist, writer
- Michael Collins Ajereh – executive producer, featured artist, writer, production (tracks 1–3, 5–7, 10, 11, 13–16, 18)
- Tunji "Tee Billz" Balogun – executive producer
- Olamide Adedeji – featured artist, writer
- Olusegun Olowokere – featured artist, writer
- Innocent Idibia – featured artist, writer
- Charles Enebeli – featured artist, writer
- Sidney Onoriode Esiri – featured artist, writer
- Glendale Goshia Gordon – featured artist, writer
- Ayoleyi Hanniel Solomon – featured artist, writer
- Ayodeji Balogun – featured artist, writer
- Paul and Peter Okoye – featured artist, writer
- Sunday "Baby Fresh" Enejere – production (tracks 4, 14)
- Aluko "Altims" Timothy – production (track 9)
- Ben'Jamin "Spellz" Obadje – production (track 12)
- Richard "P2J" Isong – production (tracks 8, 17)

== Release history ==
Region	Date	Format	Version	Label
Various	December 19, 2015	CD, digital download	Standard	Mavin Records; 323 Entertainment
Various	February 23, 2016	CD, digital download	Deluxe	Mavin Records; 323 Entertainment
