= Somebody's Son =

Single by Tiwa Savage featuring Brandy

from the EP Water & Garri
- Released: 12 October 2021
- Genre: Afrobeats; R&B; soul
- Length: 3:38
- Label: Motown; UMGSA
- Songwriters: Tiwatope Savage; Brandy Norwood; Michael Ajayi; Richard King; Sunday Adegeye; Oluwatosin Oguntade
- Producer: Mystro

Music video
- "Somebody's Son" on YouTube

"Somebody's Son" is a song by Nigerian singer Tiwa Savage featuring American singer Brandy. It was released as the second single from the former's second EP Water & Garri (2021) by Motown Records and Universal Music South Africa on 12 October 2021. The song blends Afrobeats with R&B and soul, and explores themes of love and emotion. It received positive reviews from critics, who praised the vocal chemistry between Savage and Brandy and its mellow production. The song was nominated for Outstanding International Song at the 53rd NAACP Image Awards, and received other nominations from The Headies, The Beatz Awards, and the All Africa Music Awards.

== Background ==
In an interview with Dash Radio, Tiwa Savage said she had long admired American singer Brandy and described her as one of her favorite vocalists. She recalled that after moving to London, listening to Brandy's "I Wanna Be Down" inspired her to pursue singing, and that she would study and mimic the singer's vocal runs and ad-libs. Savage later explained that she later met Brandy through a mutual connection, which led to a studio session where Brandy suggested they record a song together. During the session, Savage presented "Somebody's Son", which she had already written.

== Critical reception ==
"Somebody's Son" received positive reviews from critics, who praised Tiwa Savage and Brandy's vocal chemistry, its romantic theme, and its mellow production. Solope Alatise from the Indiependent said the two's vocals "blend seamlessly" and its beat "creates a picture of intimacy and generational love." Alatise added that the song "makes you hopeful again" and concluded that it "hails new hope for love." Afrocritik's Abioye Damilare Samson included it in the publication's list of "10 Tiwa Savage Songs That Crowned Her the Queen of Afrobeats". He described the song as "a subtle heartbreak anthem" and "undeniably one of the most memorable cuts" from Water & Garri, further calling it an "international collaboration that was nothing short of flawless" where "the duo's voices glide effortlessly over the mellow production." Emmanuel Daraloye, writing for TheCable, called the track "a perfect blend of synergy between two world-class songstresses."

In a review for Pulse Nigeria, Motolani Alake described "Somebody's Son" as "the nucleus" of Water & Garri, adding that it "denounces men but still craves the warmth of romance" and suggested that it would have been more relatable with Simi instead of Brandy. Stephen Onu of Premium Times praised the song's "energy everyone would love to vibe to" and called it "simply enjoyable and danceable." Adewojumi Aderemi of The Native described "Somebody's Son" as "a nice upbeat pop number," commending Brandy for her "stunning voice," adding that the collaboration was "perfect" and hoped it would "get mainstream attention." Adanna O of TXT Mag said "Somebody's Son" was "the most upbeat song on [Water & Garri]" yet "the most heartbreaking," praising Brandy's "soft, warm and reassuring" vocals, concluding that the song felt like "a career highlight both for Tiwa, and dedicated Africans who have followed R&B for years." Gabriel Myers Hansen, reviewing for Music in Africa, characterized it as "a redemption song, an undeniable diva anthem" with "jolly drums and rosy harmonies" and "searing runs over a passionate chorus," noting that it "celebrates the vocal genius of both acts" and concluded that it "faces forward" rather than dwelling on heartbreak.

== Music video ==
The music video for "Somebody's Son" was directed by Meji Alabi and premiered following a YouTube Live event titled Shoot Your Shot Hotline on 12 October 2021. It features Tiwa Savage braiding Brandy's hair, alongside scenes depicting Black love, familial bonds, and sisterhood. The video includes a father and son with matching durags, a pregnant couple, an engaged couple, and men and boys embracing. Savage described the collaboration with Brandy as a "full-circle moment with [her] all-time idol" and said the song conveys "a message of hope." Brandy performs her verse as she is embraced by Savage and a chestnut-skinned man, and the two appear together in glamour and performance shots.

== Live performances ==
In December 2025, Tiwa Savage performed "Somebody's Son" at the WeLoveYa Festival in Cotonou. Footage of the performance garnered attention online after Savage became emotional on stage and briefly paused while holding back tears.

== Accolades ==
Awards and nominations for "Somebody's Son"
Organization	Year	Category	Result	Ref.
The Beatz Awards	2021	Songwriter of the Year (Tiwa Savage & Brandy for "Somebody's Son")	Nominated	
The Beatz Awards	2021	Afro R&B Producer of the Year (Mystro for "Somebody's Son")	Nominated	
NAACP Image Awards	2022	Outstanding International Song	Nominated	
The Headies	2022	Best Recording of the Year	Nominated	
All Africa Music Awards	2022	Best African Collaboration	Nominated	
All Africa Music Awards	2022	Artiste of the Year (Tiwa Savage for "Somebody's Son")	Nominated	
All Africa Music Awards	2022	Best Female Artiste in West Africa (Tiwa Savage & Brandy for "Somebody's Son")	Nominated	

== Charts ==
Chart performance for "Somebody's Son"
Chart (2021–22)	Peak position
Nigeria (TurnTable Top 50)	5
UK Afrobeats (Official Charts)	6
US Afrobeats Songs (Billboard)	42
US Adult R&B Songs (Billboard)	19

== Credits and personnel ==
Credits adapted from Apple Music.

- Tiwa Savage – vocals, songwriting
- Brandy Norwood – vocals, songwriting
- Segun "Mystro" Ajayi – production, songwriting, recording engineering
- Richard "Rich" King – songwriting
- Sunday Adegeye – songwriting
- Oluwatosin Oguntade – songwriting
- Michael "Mike" Manitshana – mixing, mastering
- Peter Gonzales – immersive mixing
