= My Darlin =

Single by Tiwa Savage

from the album R.E.D
- Released: 8 October 2014
- Genre: Afrobeat; Afro pop; R&B
- Length: 4:10
- Label: Mavin; 323
- Songwriter: Tiwatope Omolara Savage
- Producers: Don Jazzy; Babyfresh

Tiwa Savage singles chronology
| "Love in Yellow" (2014) | "My Darlin" (2014) | "Keys to the City" (2014) |

Music video
- "My Darlin" on YouTube

"My Darlin" is a song by Nigerian singer Tiwa Savage. It was released on 8 October 2014, as the lead single from her second studio album R.E.D (2015). It was produced by Don Jazzy and Babyfresh. "My Darlin" was recorded during rumours of divorce between her and her husband.

== Background ==
Savage first announced the song's release through her Instagram page where she stated "Yesssssssss my new single has been cooking and now it’s ready 8.10.14 is the due date … Baba God has done it for us again #Mavins".

== Music video ==
The music video for "My Darlin", was released on 26 November 2014. Directed by Kemi Adetiba, it depicts a nostalgic love story. The video features Tiwa Savage as an older woman reminiscing about her past romance with a soldier, portrayed by Emmanuel Ikubese, during her granddaughter's wedding. The opening scene begins with the older woman making jokes at a wedding party. The video transitions into various emotional scenes, including Savage in a wedding gown, expressing joy and grief. Cameo appearances in the video include stylists Zedeye and Kunbi Oyelese. The visual narrative combines elements of humor and melancholy. By February 2015, the music video hit 1 million views on YouTube.

== Critical reception ==
Writers of tooXclusive shared their thoughts on Tiwa Savage's "My Darlin", each offering different perspectives. Jim Donnett noted that Tiwa's vocal choices seemed typical and questioned the use of auto-tune, but appreciated the song's feel. He rated it 3 out of 5, concluding, "it's Tiwa though and I love her". Funke highlighted the repetitive nature of the song but acknowledged Don Jazzy's vocal contribution added spice. Rating it 2.5 out of 5, she mentioned, "if you’re not careful, you might catch yourself chanting my darling repeatedly". Jimmy King enjoyed the song but found the beat lacking creativity, praising Tiwa and Don Jazzy's synergy. He rated it 3 out of 5, commenting on the "good song writing from Tiwa Savage and lovely backup from Don Jazzy". Al Yhusuff pointed out issues with the song's initial seconds and repetition but still considered it a decent track, rating it 3 out of 5. He stated, "nice song. Good beat."

== Accolades ==
Awards and nominations for "My Darlin"
| Organization | Year | Category | Result | Ref. |
|---|---|---|---|---|
| African Muzik Magazine Awards | 2015 | Video of the Year | Nominated | |
| COSON Song Awards | 2015 | Best Love Song | Nominated | |

== Release history ==
Release history and formats for "My Darlin"
| Region | Date | Format | Label |
|---|---|---|---|
| Various | 8 October 2014 | Digital download | Mavin; 323 |
