= Celia (album) =

Studio album by Tiwa Savage
- Released: 27 August 2020
- Recorded: 2019–2020
- Studios: UMGNG Studios; Sarm West Studios
- Genres: Afrobeats; R&B; pop
- Length: 38:43
- Languages: English; Yoruba
- Labels: Motown; Island; UMG; Capitol
- Producers: Rexxie; Pheelz; Blaq Jerzee; Cracker Mallo; Speroach Beatz; Rhyme Bamz; P2J; Kill September; Boundaries; TMXO; Ozedikus Nwanne

Tiwa Savage chronology
Sugarcane (2017)	Celia (2020)	Water & Garri (2021)

Singles from Celia
- 1. "Attention" Released: 20 November 2019; 2. "Dangerous Love" Released: 9 July 2020; 3. "Koroba" Released: 6 August 2020; 4. "Temptation" Released: 24 August 2020

Celia is the third studio album by Nigerian singer Tiwa Savage. It was released on 27 August 2020, by Motown, Island Records, and Universal Music Group. Celia features guest appearances from Sam Smith, Naira Marley, Stefflon Don, Dice Ailes, Davido, and Hamzaa. The album was supported by the singles "Attention", "Dangerous Love", "Koroba", and "Temptation". It was executively produced by Efe Ogbeni, and Vannessa Amadi-Ogbonna under the supervision of Universal subsidiaries UMG-SA, and UMGNG.

Rooted in Afrobeats music, Celia received a mixed-to-positive response from critics. Some praised Savage's artistic growth and evolving image, while others criticized some of the lyrical themes.

== Background and concept ==
On the 2nd of May 2019, it was announced that Savage signed an exclusive recording contract with Universal Records. On the 19th of July 2019, she performed "Keys to the Kingdom" on Beyoncé's The Lion King: The Gift album, later appearing in its visual counterpart Black Is King (2020). In September 2019, she released her first global single, "49-99", through Motown Records. Celia was written at three songwriting camps in Lagos, London and Los Angeles, California. Savage booked eight rooms for 15 days at the Oriental Hotel in Lagos, where producers and musicians could come and go, bouncing ideas off one another as Savage supervised, selected tracks and came up with top lines. "Just put your heart into it, and let's have fun," she reportedly told them. With news of the album came a "conscious branding" that positioned Savage as an activist and socio-political commentator. Pulse Nigeria said the album "represents a veritable rebrand from an artist who is entering her veteran days."

Celia was dedicated to Savage's mother, whom the album was named after in tribute. Savage elaborated that her mother "embodies everything that this album is. It speaks to a strong, modern African woman. This album is Afrobeats from a very female perspective. It's an extension of the African woman: she still values her culture and her upbringing, but she's also well-traveled, so it's blending those two worlds."

In an interview with The New York Times, Savage commented on the album's other inspirations:

"I've experienced a divorce, being a single mom and seeing backlash for being sometimes too sexy in a male-dominated industry. [...] I wanted my message to be clear. I have a platform now to encourage young African girls—and just young girls in general—how important it is to be true to yourself and be unapologetically strong as a woman. Initially when you hear it, it's just like, 'Oh, I want to be in the club, shaking my butt.' So I'll get you that way first. And then you go back and listen to the lyrics and then you get inspired by it."

YNaija wrote: "Celia puts Tiwa in a new political world, one that honours [her] predecessors – and its pool of bubblegum tracks but pushes for a closer examination of womanhood. She [said] the album was inspired and named after Celia Savage, her strong, supportive mother who's given a cameo in a promo clip alongside Kelly Rowland and Genevieve Nnaji saying 'I am Celia.'"

== Release and promotion ==
In May 2020, Savage appeared on the cover of Billboard's first issue devoted entirely to Africa alongside Afrobeats artists Davido and Mr Eazi. Later, Savage became the first African music artist to have two billboards in Times Square, New York on the album's release day. Celia received 120 US programmed playlists across all the DSPs and secured cover placements from Apple Music, YouTube Music, Pandora, Spotify, Amazon Music, Tidal, Deezer, Boomplay, Audiomack and UduX. Boomplay made Tiwa the face of 'Top New Music' – the biggest playlist on its platform.

=== Singles ===
On 20 November 2019, Savage released "Attention", her first single off the project. The single was released under Universal Music Group, and produced by Blaq Jerzee. That same week, she performed the song at ColorxStudios in London on A Colors Show. On 9 July 2020, she released "Dangerous Love", which was produced by Cracker Mallo. On 15 July 2020, Savage released the music video for "Dangerous Love", directed by Ibra. On 6 August 2020, she released "Koroba", produced by London and received praise for the song from Pulse Nigeria editor Motolani Alake, shortly after the release of the music video directed by Clarence Peters. On 24 August 2020, She released "Temptation", a song she praises Fireboy DML for co-writing with her, and Sam Smith. The song was produced by London in Lagos, Nigeria.

=== Live performances ===
On 24 August 2020, during her U.S. television debut, Savage performed "Dangerous Love" on The Tonight Show Starring Jimmy Fallon on NBC. On August 31, 2020, Savage performed live alternative versions of the singles "Dangerous Love", "Attention", and "Koroba". She also performed Reekado Banks's 2017 single "Like", a song she was featured on alongside Fiokee.

== Composition ==
In July 2020, Savage commented, "I decided to really just go back to what I loved and what I fell in love with as a musician, which is afrobeat combined with soul and R&B. [...] So it's very, very heavily influenced by that. And while I was creating the album, I actually didn't listen to any other songs during the process of creating it because I didn’t want to be influenced by the trend of what was happening. You can expect real, hardcore R&B fused with afrobeats with this album."

NativeMag said, "[Savage] is defiant of her conservative Nigerian audience and seeks to rework imaginations of what a female artist should look like, leading the industry whilst owning her sex appeal in a way that is rare to these parts. On Celia, Tiwa Savage comes out with an onslaught of carnal numbers, reminding us why she labels herself a bad gyal." The360Mag remarked that Celia "further solidifies Tiwa's position as one of the leading artists in the forefront pushing Afrobeats to a global audience," and later added, "Celia demonstrates the incredible musical growth she’s experienced over the years."

In September 2020, Essence wrote, "Celia shows us how Savage stays in the pocket of what makes listening to R&B so warm, with the complex melodies and messages that align with afrobeat music. The album is a sonic journey—taking us through falling in love, heartbreak, navigating double standards and gender dynamics in relationships, boosting one's confidence, and even showing gratitude for the road taken thus far in her career." That same month, The New York Times wrote, "Celia is an album of sleekly insinuating Afrobeats grooves that carry love songs and understated but purposeful messages of empowerment. The lyrics switch between English and Yoruba as Savage glides through her melodies, rarely raising her airy, unflappable voice."

=== Songs ===
Celia opens with "Save My Life", an Afrobeats/house track that feels "light and feathery". The "luminous" "Temptation" (featuring Sam Smith) has lyrics about being unable to resist a love interest, over streaks of saxophones. "Ole" (featuring Naira Marley) was compared to Rihanna's "Bitch Better Have My Money". The song boasts a captivating preamble, with a near forty seconds of vibrant horns, feel-good drums and an ensorcelling bass guitar. On "Koroba", Savage addresses the slut-shaming young women face when surrounded with rich men or politicians by poking fun about "living lavish" on the national budget.

"Bombay" (featuring Stefflon Don and Dice Ailes) is a "good body" anthem "calibrated" to a dancehall beat, with "a bubbly, feminine confidence that makes for a good dance record". "Dangerous Love" speaks about a toxic relationship. "Park Well" (featuring Davido) is "feel-good love song". The "vulnerable" "Us" has a piano accompaniment, and Savage "confronts her rocky separation from her ex-husband Tee Billz in 2018" with "lovely vocal runs". "It's definitely the first time I'm being vulnerable... When we first started, it was just like, 'Me and you, we're going to conquer the world.' And then it got to a point where the brand was getting big, and when I had to make a decision, it wasn't just me and you," she commented. "FWMM (F*CK With My Mind)" has an audacious tone.

"Pakalamisi" (featuring a "soulful" Hamzaa) sounds like "a regular Afrobeats cut on commercial radio, filled out with Hamzaa's crispy vocals". On "Attention", Savage details her worth in a relationship. "Glory" is "a testament that Tiwa soars when she does undiluted pop. This trance/EDM pop song is further uplifted by its immaculate songwriting, loaded with a deep message about Tiwa reaping the fruits of her efforts." "Celia's Song" is about Savage's mother supporting her through her music and with prayers. NativeMag added the song has an "choir-like harmonies" and a "mixing of fellowship into the song’s end" which brings a "gospel feel" to it.

=== Art ===
According to Savage, the inspiration behind the album cover is also her mother. She shared that growing up and playing Ludo, she remembered that one has to move to win, and such is applicable in real life because being successful in life requires boldness. The cover art is an animated version of herself and her mother on a Ludo game board.

== Track listing ==
No.	Title	Writer(s)	Producer(s)	Length
1.	"Save My Life"	Tiwatope Savage	P2J; Pheelz	3:37
2.	"Temptation" (with Sam Smith)	Savage; Samuel Frederick Smith; Adedamola Adefolahan	TMXO; London; Boundaries; Kill September	2:48
3.	"Ole" (featuring Naira Marley)	Savage; Azeez Adeshina Fashola; Muhammad Animashaun	Rexxie	3:04
4.	"Koroba"	Savage	London	2:34
5.	"Bombay" (featuring Stefflon Don and Dice Ailes)	Savage; Stephanie Victoria Allen; Shasha Damilola Alesh	Rhyme Bamz	2:44
6.	"Dangerous Love"	Savage	Cracker Mallo	3:13
7.	"Park Well" (featuring Davido)	Savage; David Adedeji Adeleke	Speroach Beatz	2:59
8.	"Us (Interlude)"	Tiwatope Savage		2:32
9.	"FWMM (F*CK with My Mind)"	Tiwatope; Animashaun; Princewill Emmanuel; Segun Michael Ajayi	London	2:34
10.	"Pakalamisi" (featuring Hamzaa)	Savage; Malika Hamzaa	Ozedikus Nwanne	3:14
11.	"Attention"	Savage	Blaq Jerzee	3:26
12.	"Glory"	Savage; SAK PASE; Kheil "Stone" Harrison		2:57
13.	"Celia's Song"	Savage; Animashaun; Timi Aladeloba	Pheelz	3:01
Total length:				38:43

Sample credits

- Moelogo vocal was sampled on "Celia's Song".

== Personnel ==
Vocalists

- Tiwa Savage – vocals, writer
- Mohammed Animashaun – backing vocals on "Celia's Song"
- Samuel Frederick Smith – vocals on "Temptation"
- Azeez Adeshina Fashola – vocals on "Ole"
- Stephanie Victoria Allen – vocals on "Bombay"
- Shasha Damilola Alesh – vocals on "Bombay"
- David Adedeji Adeleke – vocals on "Park Well"
- Malika Hamzaa – vocals on "Pakalamisi"

Co-writers

- Adedamola Adefolahan – "Temptation"
- Stacy Barthe – "FWMM (F*CK With My Mind)"
- Princewill Emmanuel – "FWMM (F*CK with My Mind)"
- Muhammad Animashaun – "FWMM (F*CK with My Mind)", "Ole" and "Celia's Song"
- Segun Michael Ajayi – "FWMM (F*CK with My Mind)"
- Timi Aladeloba – "Celia's Song"
- Sak Pase – "Glory"

Production

- Efe Ogbeni – exclusive producer
- Vannessa Amadi-Ogbonna – exclusive producer
- Rexxie – "Ole"
- Blaq Jerzee – "Attention"
- Speroach Beatz – "Pack Well"
- Pheelz – "Save My Life" and "Celia's Song"
- Cracker Mallo – "Dangerous Love"
- London – "Temptation", "Koroba", and "FWMM (F*CK With My Mind)"
- Ozedikus Nwanne – "Pakalamisi"
- TMXO – "Temptation"
- Boundaries – "Temptation"
- Kill September – "Temptation"
- P2J – "Save My Life"
- Rhyme Bamz – "Bombay"

Note

- The album was mixed by Manny Marroquin, Tee-Y Mix, and mastered by Chris Athens.

== Charts ==
Chart (2020)	Peak position
US World Albums (Billboard)	15
