= Water & Garri =

EP by Tiwa Savage
- Released: 20 August 2021
- Genre: Afro-fusion; R&B; soul
- Length: 19:04
- Label: Motown; UMG
- Producer: Tay Iwar; Cracker Mallo; Mystro; Le Mav; Rich King

Tiwa Savage chronology
Celia (2020)	Water & Garri (2021)	Water & Garri (Original Motion Picture Soundtrack) (2024)

Singles from Water & Garri
- 1. "Tales by Moonlight" Released: 19 August 2021; 2. "Somebody's Son" Released: 12 October 2021

Water & Garri is the second extended play by Nigerian singer Tiwa Savage, released on 20 August 2021 by Motown Records and Universal Music Group. The EP features guest appearances from Nas, Brandy, Amaarae, Tay Iwar, and Rich King. Supported by the singles "Tales by Moonlight" and "Somebody's Son", it serves as a follow-up to her third studio album, Celia (2020), and was produced by Tay Iwar, Cracker Mallo, Mystro, Le Mav, and Rich King.

== Background and singles ==
Savage revealed the EP's track list and cover art on 18 August 2021. She released "Tales by Moonlight" featuring Amaarae as its lead single on 19 August 2021; the song was produced by Cracker Mallo. The music video for "Tales by Moonlight" was released on 21 December 2021, and directed by Meji Alabi. In the video, Tiwa and Amaarae are in a bar and at a neon-lit gas station with men around them. The EP's second single, "Somebody's Son" featuring Brandy, was released on 12 October 2021. The music video for the single, also directed by Alabi, arrived the same day, and features scenes of Savage braiding Brandy's hair, along with moments of Black love, family, and sisterhood.

== Critical reception ==
Professional ratings
Review scores
Source	Rating
Afrocritik	8.5/10
Premium Times	8/10
Pulse Nigeria	8.6/10

Motolani Alake of Pulse Nigeria described 'Water & Garri as a "supremely successful" EP that shows Tiwa Savage entering her "graceful years". He praised its experimental sound, authentic themes, and strong replay value, adding that Savage appears more mature and vulnerable on the project, calling it her best body of work and rating it 8.6/10. Chinonso Ihekire, writing for Afrocritik, called the EP as a "no-skip record" with "something quite magical and therapeutic". Ihekire hailed its songwriting, "sophistication" in production, and its ability to "resonate with multiple demographics", awarding it 8.5/10.

Adewojumi Aderemi, a writer for The Native magazine, characterized Water & Garri as a "dynamic amalgamation of tastes and styles" with "so much more sonic depth", praising how its "stunning" tracks "subvert our expectations and indeed exceed them" while showing Savage "doesn't compromise her identity" in the global pop space. In a review for TheCable, Emmanuel Daraloye called the EP "a dart between hope and despair", as well as a "detour from the pop-centric Mama Jam Jam we all know" and a "great addition to Tiwa's impressive discography".

Stephen Onu of Premium Times praised the EP for showing a "more personal and emotional side" to the singer, or "a 'Tiwa' without the 'Savage'". He commended it for its "phenomenal" production, and rated it 8/10. Adanna Ogbolu of TXT Mag called Water & Garri "the music she was born to make", praising its "perfect and outstanding features" while noting it also shows how "stardom and commercial appeal can rob an artiste of her voice".

== Track listing ==
Water & Garri track listing
No.	Title	Writer(s)	Producer(s)	Length
1.	"Work Fada" (featuring Nas and Rich King)	Tiwatope Savage; Nasir Jones; Richard King; Segun Michael Ajayi	Rich King	6:26
2.	"Ade Ori"	Savage; Ajayi; King; Taiwo Sotonwa; Mohammed Animashaun; Adesewa Solagbade	Mystro	2:16
3.	"Tales By Moonlight" (featuring Amaarae)	Savage; Ama Genfi; Ajayi; Ayodeji Olowu; King; Solagbade	Cracker Mallo	3:24
4.	"Somebody's Son" (featuring Brandy)	Savage; Brandy Norwood; Ajayi; King; Sunday Adegeye; Oluwatosin Oguntade	Mystro	3:38
5.	"Special Kinda" (featuring Tay Iwar)	Savage; Austin Iwar; Chukwuemeka Obi	Tay Iwar; Le Mav	3:19
Total length:				19:04

== Personnel ==
- Rich King — production (track 1)
- Yusuf Hamashiach — recording (track 1)
- Michael "Mike" Manitshana — mixing, mastering (tracks 1–5)
- Mystro — production (track 2, 4), recording (track 4)
- Cracker Mallo — production, recording (track 3)
- Tay Iwar — production, recording (track 5)
- Le Mav — production (track 5)

== Release history ==
Release history and formats for Water & Garri
Region	Date	Format	Label
Various	20 August 2021	Streaming; digital download	Motown; UMG
