= Kele Kele Love =

Single by Tiwa Savage

from the album Once Upon a Time
- Released: 5 August 2010
- Recorded: 2010
- Genre: Afropop; R&B
- Length: 3:42
- Label: 323
- Songwriter: Tiwatope Savage
- Producer: Harmony Samuels

Tiwa Savage singles chronology
"Kele Kele Love" (2010)	"Love Me (3x)" (2010)

"Kele Kele Love" is the debut single by Nigerian singer Tiwa Savage. It was released on 5 August 2010, by 323 Entertainment. The song serves as the lead single from her debut studio album, Once Upon a Time (2013). It won Best R&B Soul Song at the 2011 Afrotainment Museke Online Music Awards.

== Background ==
"Kele Kele Love" was characterized by Savage as a "mixture of her experience and the experiences of others". In an interview with Showtime Celebrity, she expressed her worries about the song's endurance, saying, "I believe that issues are universal. Despite Kele Kele's Nigerian origins, anyone may readily learn about it because it is universal."

== Music video ==
The accompanying music video for "Kele Kele Love" was filmed in Los Angeles by Jerry Chan, Tiwa Savage and Tee Billz. It was uploaded to Savage's Vevo account on April 6 and to her YouTube account on 28 July 2011.

== Accolades ==
Year	Awards ceremony	Award description(s)	Results	Ref
2011	The Headies	Next Rated	Nominated	
2011	Channel O Music Video Awards	Most Gifted Female Video	Nominated	
2011	Afrotainment Museke Online Music Awards	Best R&B Soul Song	Won	
2011	Nigeria Music Video Awards (NMVA)	Best Use of Choreography	Nominated	

== Track listing, covers, and remixes ==
London-based production group The Busy Twist, who characterized their sound as "African-influenced bass music", remixed "Kele Kele Love". Afropop and funk are combined in the duo's rendition. "Kele Kele Love" was also remixed over a house instrumental.

No.	Title	Length
1.	"Kele Kele Love"	3:42
2.	"Kele Kele Love (House Remix)"	3:27
3.	"Kele Kele (The Busy Twist Remix)" (by The Busy Twist)	3:32
7.	"Kele Kele Love Remake" (by Sym 19 featuring Solid Star)	3:55
