= Eminado =

Single by Tiwa Savage featuring Don Jazzy

from the album Once Upon a Time
- Released: October 8, 2013
- Recorded: 2013
- Genre: Afropop
- Length: 3:42
- Label: Mavin Records; 323 Entertainment
- Songwriters: Tiwatope Savage, Michael Collins Ajereh
- Producer: Don Jazzy

Tiwa Savage singles chronology
"Olorun Mi" (2013)	"Eminado" (2013)	"Ordinary Love" (2013)

"Eminado" (meaning "Good Luck Charm") is a song by Nigerian singer Tiwa Savage. It features vocals by Don Jazzy and was released as the seventh single from her debut studio album, Once Upon a Time (2013). The song peaked at number two on MTV Base's Official Naija Top 10 chart for the week of March 7 through March 13, 2014. "Eminado" was ranked tenth on Vanguard's list of the top ten hit songs that made 2013. The song received generally positive reviews from music critics and consumers. Conversely, its music video was criticized for bearing a striking similarity to Tumi and the Volume's video for "Asinamali". "Eminado" was nominated for Hottest Single of the Year at the 2014 Nigeria Entertainment Awards and for World's Best Song at the 2014 World Music Awards.

== Background and controversy ==
"Eminado" was recorded in 2013 and translates to "Good Luck Charm". In an interview with Vanguard newspaper, Savage said the song's idea was developed during studio rehearsals and that Don Jazzy created the sound and derived its name. Savage kept her fans waiting almost two months for the video after "Eminado" was serviced to radio stations. The accompanying music video for "Eminado" was filmed by Clarence Peters and uploaded to YouTube on November 4, 2013. Jim Donnett complimented the video's fashion styling, coordination and color theme.

In January 2014, a copyright infringement lawsuit was filed against Peters after the video's release. He allegedly stole the vintage nature of the "Asinamali" video, which was released by Tumi and the Volume to honor the artistic works of Seydou Keïta. Tumi slandered Peters on Twitter and urged his fans to shine a light on the issue. Tunji "Tee Billz" Balogun, Savage's former manager and ex-husband, said they were shocked to discover that the video's idea was lifted from another video.

== Live performances ==
Savage performed "Eminado" at a farewell concert for Nelson Mandela in January 2014. She also performed the song during the 2014 Star Music Trek tour, which commenced on March 29 and ended on May 31, 2014. On March 7, 2014, Savage sang at a music festival organized by Golden Tullip Festac Lagos Hotel and Five Stars Music Ltd. She joined Sarkodie and Mafikizolo for a performance of "Eminado" at BET's "Music Around the Globe" event on June 28, 2014. Savage performed the song at the 2014 edition of Africa Unplugged, alongside Davido and Diamond Platnumz. Moreover, she performed "Eminado" at the Nigeria Independence Day event in Warri with a number of other artists, including as Ja Rule and Ashanti.

== Accolades ==
Year	Awards ceremony	Award description(s)	Results	Ref
2014	All Africa Music Awards	Best Female Artiste in West Africa (Tiwa Savage for "Eminado")	Nominated	
2014	All Africa Music Awards	Producer of the Year (Don Jazzy for "Eminado")	Won	
2014	Channel O Music Video Awards	Most Gifted Female Video	Won	
2014	Channel O Music Video Awards	Most Gifted Video of the Year	Nominated	
2014	Nigeria Entertainment Awards	Hottest Single of the Year	Nominated	
2014	Nigeria Entertainment Awards	Best Music Video of the Year (Artist & Director)	Nominated	
2014	World Music Awards	World's Best Song	Nominated	
2014	World Music Awards	World's Best Video	Nominated	
