= Sugarcane (EP) =

EP by Tiwa Savage
- Released: 22 September 2017
- Recorded: 2017
- Genre: Afropop; funk; house; pop; R&B; trap
- Length: 20:00
- Label: Mavin Records; 323 Entertainment
- Producer: Spellz; Baby Fresh; Maleek Berry; P2J

Tiwa Savage chronology
R.E.D (2015)	Sugarcane (2017)	Celia (2020)

Singles from Sugarcane
- 1. "All Over" Released: April 2, 2017; 2. "Ma Lo" Released: November 3, 2017

Sugarcane is the debut extended play by Nigerian singer Tiwa Savage. It was released on September 22, 2017, by Mavin Records and 323 Entertainment. The EP features collaborations with producers and guest artists such as Wizkid, Spellz, Baby Fresh, Maleek Berry and P2J. It explores themes of love and was recorded in English and Yoruba. Sugarcane was supported by the singles "All Over" and "Ma Lo". It was nominated for Best Album of the Year at the 2018 Nigeria Entertainment Awards.

== Background and release ==
In an interview with The Fader magazine, Savage said she did not have any plans to release Sugarcane. However, she decided to put out the project after recording so much music for her next album. Savage said she named the EP Sugarcane because the songs sounded sweet to her. The album explores themes relating to love, including the journey of wanting love, needing love, finding love, and giving love.

The lead single, "All Over", was released on April 2, 2017. The Native's Debola Abimbolu said the song is essentially about Savage's romantic feelings and likened its hook to Kcee's "Limpopo". The music video for "All Over" was filmed in Miami by Patrick Elis. In it, Savage is seen wearing an Ankara print bikini. In October 2017, Savage told Billboard magazine that the video was recorded in four and a half hours. The Wizkid-assisted track "Ma Lo" was released on November 3, 2017, as the second single. Directed by Meji Alabi, the accompanying music video for "Ma Lo" was filmed at the New Afrika Shrine. A 40-second teaser clip preceded its release. A Wizkid fan account shared behind-the-scenes clips of the video shoot on October 19, 2017. "Ma Lo" won Best Collabo at The Headies 2018.

On December 28, 2017, Savage released a colorful music video for the title track "Sugarcane", which was also directed by Meji Alabi. In the video, Savage dances against a colorful backdrop. The music video for "Get It Now" was released on February 22, 2018; it depicts a romance between the singer and a gym trainer. In March 2018, Savage released the Omarion-assisted remix of "Get It Now". The song's music video was directed by Meji Alabi and released in April 2018. It was filmed in a fast food restaurant and shows Savage and Omarion exchanging suggestive looks in the presence of their significant other.

== Composition ==
Sugarcane is a mixture of Afropop, funk, house, pop, R&B and trap. The title track, "Sugarcane", is a tribute to a man with whom she has an admiration for. Wilfred Okiche described the song as "fun, fast and filthy". "All Over" depicts a sexually submissive woman; the song is composed of watered-down lyrics and evokes the need to dance. The highlife-inspired track "Ma Lo" is a torrid romance track. "Get it Now" has an African-infused homogenous sound. The Bubblegum pop track "Me and You" features dembow rhythm and draws comparisons to Beyonce's "XO". The P2J-produced track "Hold Me Down" contains a Bollywood-inspired riff.

== Critical reception ==
Professional ratings
Review scores
Source	Rating
Pulse Nigeria	3.5/5 stars

Sugarcane received generally positive reviews from music critics. Jim Donnett of TooXclusive praised Savage's songwriting ability and said the EP embodies "traits of rawness and sincerity". A Pulse Nigeria contributor, who goes by Jonathan, called Sugarcane "less a collection of songs and more a documentation of feelings". Reviewing for 360 Nobs, Wilfred Okiche said Savage "appears to have found her voice and niche" on Sugarcane.

Oris Aigbokhaevbolo of Music in Africa described the EP as "an efficient package selling all that has put Tiwa Savage on top of the female pop pile: sex appeal, controlled R&B vocal styling and an ease with certain kinds of production." In a review for OkayAfrica, Sabo Kpade commended Savage's songwriting efforts and said the EP has great replay value. The Native's Edwin Okolo praised Savage for embracing Afropop and said the genre "is the undercurrent that runs through the entire EP".

=== Accolades ===
Year	Awards ceremony	Award description(s)	Results
2018	Nigeria Entertainment Awards	Best Album of the Year	Nominated

== Track listing ==
No.	Title	Writer(s)	Producer(s)	Length
1.	"Sugarcane"	Tiwatope Savage	Spellz	3:20
2.	"Get It Now"	Savage	P2J	3:25
3.	"Me and You"	Savage	Maleek Berry	3:03
4.	"Hold Me Down"	Savage	P2J	3:14
5.	"All Over"	Savage	Baby Fresh	3:31
6.	"Ma Lo" (featuring Wizkid and Spellz)	Savage; Ayodeji Balogun	Spellz	3:02
Total length:				20:00

Notes

- "Me and You" contains background vocals by Maleek Berry.

== Personnel ==
- Tiwatope Savage – primary artist, writer
- Ayodeji Balogun – featured artist, writer
- Ben’Jamin Obadje – featured artist, production (tracks 1, 6)
- Peter Jay – production (tracks 2, 4)
- Maleek Shoyebi – production (track 3)
- Sunday "Baby Fresh" Enejere – production (track 5)

== Release history ==
Region	Date	Format	Version	Label
Various	September 22, 2017	CD, Digital download	Standard	Mavin Records; 323 Entertainment
