= Once Upon a Time (Tiwa Savage album) =

Studio album by Tiwa Savage

Studio album by Tiwa Savage
- Released: July 3, 2013
- Recorded: 2010–2013
- Genre: Afropop; R&B; pop; soul
- Length: 77:00
- Label: Mavin; 323
- Producer: Don Jazzy; Warren "Oak" Felder; Sauce Wilson; Harmony Samuels; Del B; GospelOnDeBeatz; Altims; Raydar Ellis; Spellz

Tiwa Savage chronology
Solar Plexus (2012)	Once Upon a Time (2013)	R.E.D (2015)

Singles from Once Upon a Time
- 1. "Kele Kele Love" Released: August 6, 2010; 2. "Ife Wa Gbona" Released: August 17, 2010; 3. "Love Me (3x)" Released: April 30, 2011; 4. "Without My Heart" Released: December 5, 2011; 5. "Folarin" Released: December 13, 2012; 6. "Olorun Mi" Released: June 3, 2013; 7. "Eminado" Released: October 8, 2013

Once Upon a Time is the debut studio album by Nigerian singer Tiwa Savage. It was released on July 3, 2013, by Mavin Records and 323 Entertainment. The album was made available for purchase on iTunes a day before its official release, and features guest appearances from Don Jazzy, Flavour N'abania, Leo Wonder, Iceberg Slim, Sarkodie and General Pype. Its production was handled by Don Jazzy, Warren Oak Felder, Sauce Wilson, Harmony Samuels, GospelOnDeBeatz, Altims, Del B, Raydar Ellis and Spellz. Once Upon a Time was supported by seven singles—"Kele Kele Love", "Ife Wa Gbona", "Love Me (3x)", "Without My Heart", "Folarin", "Olorun Mi" and "Eminado". It was nominated for Best Album of the Year at the 2014 Nigeria Entertainment Awards and for Best R&B/Pop Album at The Headies 2014.

== Background and promotion ==
Once Upon a Time was initially scheduled for release in 2011, but problems with clearance made Savage push back its release date. The album comprises twenty one tracks, including two bonus tracks. Savage named the album Once Upon a Time in order to portray the positive stories about her life. She wanted to motivate other upcoming artists by telling them that, once upon a time, she was a little girl in Isale Eko who dreamt of being a star. While speaking to Berklee College of Music's Brenda Pike, she hinted to possibly recording songs with Chuck Harmony, Warren Oak Felder and Sosick. Moreover, she said the album would include records in her native language, Yoruba, and would incorporate musical styles such as pop, R&B and soul.

Once Upon a Time features collaborations with Don Jazzy, Flavour N'abania, Leo Wonder, Iceberg Slim, Sarkodie and General Pype. Its production was handled by Don Jazzy, Warren Oak Felder, Sauce Wilson, Harmony Samuels, GospelOnDeBeatz, Del B, Raydar Ellis and Spellz. On May 26, 2013, Savage revealed the album's cover art and track list during a private album listening party held at the Wheatbaker Hotel in Ikoyi, Lagos. Guests in attendance included Banky W., Waje, Tunde Demuren, and Eku Edewor, among others.

=== Singles and other releases ===
The album's lead single, "Kele Kele Love", was released on August 6, 2010, marking her official debut single. The accompanying music video for the song was filmed in Los Angeles by Jerry Chan, Savage and Tee Billz, released on November 4, 2010. The album's second single, "Ife Wa Gbona", was released on August 17, 2010. It features vocals by Nigerian singer Leo Wonder and peaked at number 66 on Afribiz's Top 100 music chart. On October 8, 2012, the music video for "Ife Wa Gbona" was released, and was directed by Bolaji Kekere-Ekun. The video won Best Highlife and was nominated for Best Use of Costumes, Best Indigenous Concept and Video of the Year at the 2013 Nigeria Music Video Awards (NMVA). The album's third single, "Love Me (3x)", was released on April 30, 2011. Its music video was also filmed in Los Angeles by Sesan Ogunro. Savage won Best Vocal Performance (Female) and Best R&B Single for "Love Me (3x)" at The Headies 2012.

The album's fifth single, "Without My Heart", was released on December 5, 2011. It features vocals by Don Jazzy and peaked at number 37 on Afribiz's Top 100 music chart. The song's music video was directed by Mark Hofmeyr; it was nominated for Best African Act Video at the 2013 4Syte TV Music Video Awards and for Most Gifted Female Video at the 2013 Channel O Music Video Awards. Furthermore, the song earned Savage and Don Jazzy a nomination at the 2013 Nigeria Entertainment Awards. The Spellz-produced track "Folarin" was released on December 13, 2012, as the album's fifth single. The album's sixth single, "Olorun Mi", was released on June 3, 2013. Its music video was directed by George Guise. Savage told Ebuka Obi-Uchendu of Channels TV's Rubbin' Minds that the song pays tribute to the Dana Plane Crash, Goldie Harvey and Justice Esiri. "Eminado" was released for radio stations as the album's seventh single on October 8, 2013. In the aforementioned interview with Vanguard newspaper, Savage said she and Don Jazzy came up with the song's idea while rehearsing in the studio. The Clarence Peters-directed music video for "Eminado" was released on November 4, 2013.

Savage dedicated the song "Written All Over Your Face" to her fiance for the role he played in her life. "Written All Over Your Face" was criticized for having lewd and explicit lyrics. The Moe Musa-directed music video for "Wanted" was released on May 27, 2014. The video's release triggered an angry backlash among critics.

== Critical reception ==
Professional ratings
Review scores
Source	Rating
TayoTV	8.75/10
Hip Hop World Magazine	4/5 stars
Nigerian Entertainment Today	4/5 stars
TooXclusive	2.5/5 stars

Once Upon a Time was met with generally positive reviews from music critics. Ayomide Tayo of Nigerian Entertainment Today awarded the album 4 stars out of 5, praising Savage's songwriting skills and commending the producers for bringing "depth and range to the album's production." TayoTV's Ronke Adepoju assigned a score of 8.75/10, applauding Savage for "showing her versatility by working with different artistes from different genres". Adepoju also said she "managed to pull it off with the minimum help possible." Hip Hop World Magazine granted the album 4 stars out of 5, acknowledging Savage for "producing an album that accommodates her songwriting skill and pop ambitions."

In a less enthusiastic review, TooXclusive's Ogaga Sakpaide gave the album 2.5 stars out of 5, criticizing it for lacking "an actual identity and organic sound". Writing for YNaija, Wilfred Okiche said the album has "too many fillers, too much autotune, too much Don Jazzy and an over dependence on the gloss". Okiche also wrote that "one has to dig deep to find the real substance".

=== Accolades ===
Year	Awards ceremony	Award description(s)	Results	Ref
2014	Nigeria Entertainment Awards	Best Album of the Year	Nominated	
2014	The Headies	Best R&B/Pop Album	Nominated	

== Track listing ==
Once Upon a Time – Standard edition
No.	Title	Writer(s)	Producer(s)	Length
1.	"Once Upon a Time"	Tiwatope Savage; Marcus McCauley; Rahima Balogun; Zakira Ousley	Tiwa Savage	1:54
2.	"Wanted"	Savage; Tiffany Fred	Warren Oak Felder	3:30
3.	"Ileke"	Savage; Tunji Balogun	GospelOnDeBeatz	4:00
4.	"Middle Passage"	Savage	Raydar Ellis	5:01
5.	"Olorun Mi"	Savage	Sauce Wilson	3:52
6.	"Why Don't You Love Me"	Savage	Don Jazzy; Altims	3:56
7.	"Fela Interlude"	Fela Anikulapo Kuti	Sauce Wilson	1:23
8.	"Love Me (3x)"	Savage; Richard King	Harmony Samuels	3:39
9.	"Eminado" (featuring Don Jazzy)	Savage	Don Jazzy	3:50
10.	"Folarin"	Savage; Oluwatobi Wande Ojosipe	Spellz	4:11
11.	"Oh Yeah" (featuring Don Jazzy)	Savage	Don Jazzy	3:24
12.	"Shout Out" (featuring Iceberg Slim and Sarkodie)	Savage; Olusegun Olowokere; Michael Owusu Addo	Spellz	3:50
13.	"Written All Over Your Face"	Savage; Fred	Warren Oak Felder	3:31
14.	"Get Low"	Savage	Sauce Wilson	3:46
15.	"Ife Wa Gbona" (featuring Leo Wonder)	Savage; Leo Wonder	Sossick	4:48
16.	"Eji Ma Fia"	Savage; Phillip Okafor; Chioma Omeruah	Spellz	5:05
17.	"Baby Mo" (featuring Flavour N'abania)	Savage; Chinedu Okoli	Del B	3:34
18.	"Stand as One" (featuring General Pype)	Savage; Olayiwola Ibrahim Majekodunmi	Spellz	4:28
19.	"Thank You"	Savage; Aluko Timothy	Don Jazzy	2:33

Once Upon a Time – Bonus tracks
No.	Title	Writer(s)	Producer(s)	Length
20.	"Without My Heart" (featuring Don Jazzy)	Savage; Fred; Balogun; Michael Collins Ajereh	Warren Oak Felder	3:53
21.	"Kele Kele Love"	Savage	Harmony Samuels	3:42
Total length:				77:00

Samples

- "Wanted" samples a line from Damian Marley's "Welcome to Jamrock". It also contains a sample of Ini Kamoze's "World a Music".
- "Fela Interlude" samples Fela Kuti's "Lady".
- "Without My Heart" samples the instrumental of Lumidee's "Never Leave You (Uh Oooh, Uh Oooh)".

== Personnel ==
- Tiwatope Savage – primary artist, writer
- Michael Collins Ajereh – executive producer, record producer, featured artist
- Tunji "Tee Billz" Balogun – executive producer, writer
- Warren "Oak" Felder – record producer
- Sauce Wilson – record producer
- Harmony Samuels – record producer
- Gospel On D Beatz – record producer
- Del B – record producer
- Raydar Ellis – record producer
- Spellz Magik Boi – record producer
- Sossick – record producer
- Chinedu Okoli – featured artist, writer
- Leo Wonder – featured artist, writer
- Olusegun Olowokere – featured artist, writer
- Michael Owusu Addo – featured artist, writer
- General Pype – featured artist, writer
- Oluwatobi Wande Ojosipe – writer
- Richard King – writer
- Chigul – writer
- Altims – writer
- Trafik – writer
- Marcus McCauley – writing credits
- Rahima Balogun – writing credits
- Zakira Ousley – writing credits

== Release history ==
Region	Date	Format	Label
Various	July 2, 2013	CD; Digital download	Mavin; 323
Nigeria	July 3, 2013	CD; Digital download	Mavin; 323
