= Loaded (Tiwa Savage and Asake song) =

Single by Tiwa Savage and Asake

from the album Where We Come From, Vol. 01
- Language: English; Yoruba
- Released: 8 November 2022
- Genre: Afrobeats; Fuji; amapiano; R&B; pop
- Length: 2:58
- Label: 222; Everything Savage; Empire
- Songwriters: Tiwatope Savage; Ahmed Ololade; Olamide Adedeji; Ekeh Chiaka; Michael Ajayi; Oluwasunkanmi Kareem; Oluwalewami Solagbade
- Producer: Magicsticks

Tiwa Savage singles chronology
"Koo Koo Fun" (2022)	"Loaded" (2022)	"Gbese" (2023)

Asake singles chronology
"Bandana" (2022)	"Loaded" (2022)	"Blessings (Remix)" (2022)

Music video
- "Loaded" on YouTube

"Loaded" is a song recorded by Nigerian singers Tiwa Savage and Asake for the compilation album Where We Come From, Vol. 01 (2022). It was produced by Magicsticks and released on 8 November 2022, via 222 Entertainment and Everything Savage. "Loaded" was released as the third single from the compilation album. The accompanying music video was directed by TG Omori.

== Background ==
The day before it was released, Savage made an announcement about the song via Twitter.

== Composition ==
"Loaded" incorporates a blend of musical styles, including Afrobeats, Fuji, and amapiano, combined with elements of choral vocals and melodramatic string arrangements. The production, handled by Magicsticks, emphasizes layered instrumentation with syncopated percussion and a textured soundscape. Asake's verses highlight themes of confidence and self-assurance, delivered with a distinctive flow that complements the intricate production. Tiwa Savage's contribution includes a bold acknowledgment of a leaked sex tape incident, addressing the matter directly with the line, "Who never fuck? Hands in the air," which interpolates Black Sherif's "Kwaku the Traveller." Her lyrics emphasize resilience and self-love, reinforcing the celebratory tone of the track.

== Music video ==
The music video, directed by TG Omori, was released alongside the song on 8 November 2022. Within 24 hours of its release, it garnered over 1.2 million views and 60,000 likes, debuting at number one on YouTube's trending music charts.

== Awards and nominations ==
Awards and nominations for "Loaded"
Organization	Year	Category	Result	Ref.
African Entertainment Awards USA	2023	Best Collaboration	Nominated	
African Entertainment Awards USA	2023	Best Music Video	Nominated	
Trace Awards & Festival	2023	Best Music Video	Nominated	

== Charts ==
=== Weekly charts ===
Chart performance for "Loaded"
Chart (2022)	Peak position
Nigeria (TurnTable Top 100)	3
UK Afrobeats Singles (OCC)	14
UK Indie (OCC)	16
US Afrobeats Songs (Billboard)	15

=== Year-end charts ===
2022 year-end chart performance for "Loaded"
Chart (2022)	Position
Nigeria (TurnTable)	87

== Certifications ==
Certifications for Buga
Region	Certification	Certified units/sales
Nigeria (TCSN)	4× Platinum	400,000^{‡}
^{‡} Sales+streaming figures based on certification alone.

== Personnel ==
Credits adapted from Deezer and Apple Music.

- Tiwatope Savage – vocals, songwriting
- Ahmed Ololade - vocals, songwriting
- Olamide Adedeji - songwriting
- Ekeh Chiaka - songwriting
- Michael Ajayi - songwriting
- Oluwalewami Solagbade - songwriting
- Oluwasunkanmi Kareem - songwriting, production
- Jaycen Joshua - mixing engineer, mastering engineer
- Mike Seaberg - mixing engineer
- Jacob Richards - assistant mixing engineer
- DJ Riggins - assistant mixing engineer
- Rachel Blum - assistant mixing engineer

== Release history ==
Release history and formats for "Loaded"
Region	Date	Format	Label
Various	8 November 2022	Streaming; digital download	222; Everything Savage; Empire
