= Echezonachukwu Nduka =

Nigerian poet and pianist

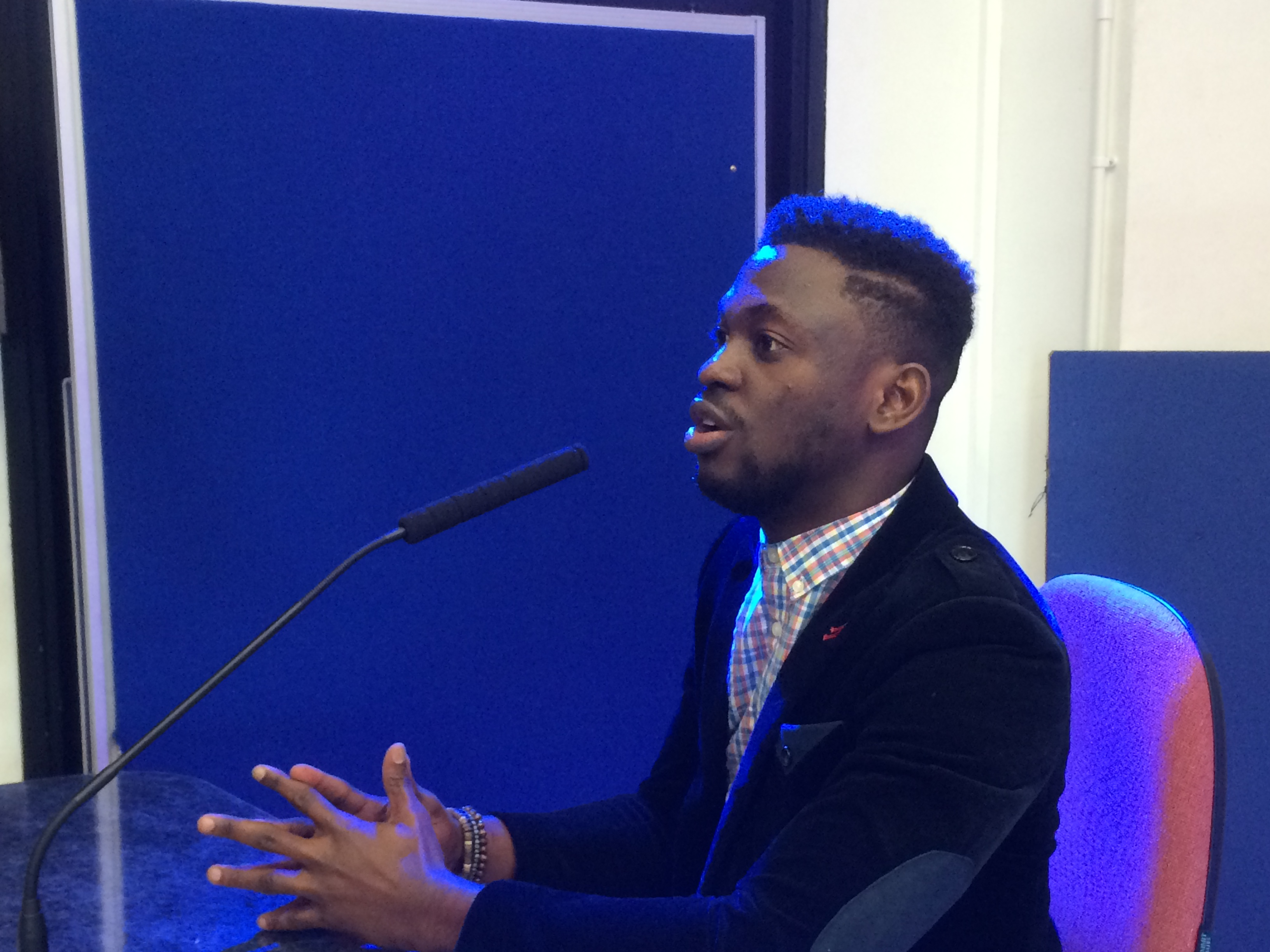
- Kingston University London, May 2015
- Born: 19 July 1989 (age 37); Onitsha, Nigeria
- Education: Kingston University London, University of Nigeria
- Occupations: Author, pianist, writer
- Writing career
- Period: 2012–present
- Genres: Classical music, African pianism, poetry, nonfiction
- Notable work: Chrysanthemums for Wide-eyed Ghosts (2018)

Echezonachukwu Chinedu Nduka // (born 19 July 1989) is a Nigerian poet, pianist, essayist, author, recording artist, and ethnomusicologist specializing in African pianism by West African composers. His work has been featured on BBC, Radio Nacional Clasica de Argentina, Radio France International (rfi), and Classical Journey.

== Career ==
=== Academia and writing ===
Nduka worked in Nigeria as a lecturer in Alvan Ikoku Federal College of Education (later known as Alvan Ikoku University of Education), Owerri. In addition, he has worked as a freelance writer and columnist for Praxis Magazine, The Nigerian Telegraph, and for African Hadithi, a Pan-African online media platform where his essays and poetry have been published. Nduka has been listed as one of the five Nigerian contemporary writers to watch out for. His published critical reviews and appraisals are centered on contemporary African literature with emphasis on poetry and nonfiction by authors of African descent.

=== Music ===
While Nduka's classical music career can be traced back to his undergraduate years as a student of Music at the University of Nigeria in the mid 2000s, his career as a solo and collaborative pianist gained momentum after his New Jersey USA debut piano recital in the summer of 2017. In many interviews and lecture-recitals, he has discussed his performance and scholarly influences, often highlighting the aesthetic and cultural resonance in the works of composers such as Akin Euba, Joshua Uzoigwe, J.H. Kwabena Nketia, Fred Onovwerosuoke, Christian Onyeji, Ayo Bankole, among others whose compositions form an essential part of his repertoire. As a classical pianist and scholar, Nduka's work focuses on African Pianism, and he has favorably been described as a pianist who "plays the piano to dazzling effect."

=== Views on African Pianism ===
As a known performer of works in the African Pianism genre, he shares his views publicly during interviews, lectures, and concerts. In an interview, Nduka expressed this personal view on the essence of African Pianism:

"The soundscape reassures me of the endless possibilities in classical music and the question of borderless identities. As a performer, it feels great to know that certain rhythmic patterns in a piece I’m performing are taken from a traditional repertoire performed by drums, gongs, rattles, xylophones, and indeed, all kinds of percussive and melorhythmic instruments. As a pianist, I can perform in collaboration with percussionists who would play an accompanying role while accentuating marked rhythmic patterns. The idea is not new. For instance, Akin Euba’s work titled ‘Igi Nla So,’ published in 1963, was composed for piano and Yoruba drums. The tonal languages of certain pieces I have performed were taken from African chants, some of them esoteric. Essentially, African pianism is the point where Western classical music and African indigenous music converge."

== Literary journals and anthologies ==
=== Poetry ===
Nduka's poem "Etude" won the Bronze Prize at the 4th Korea-Nigeria Poetry Feast. In 2016, he emerged winner of the 6th Korea-Nigeria Poetry Feast Prize for his poem "Listen". One of his spoken-word poems titled "We Wear Purple Robes" is a reflection on terrorism in Nigeria. His work has been published in reputable literary journals and anthologies including Transition Magazine, Lolwe, Isele Magazine, Sentinel Nigeria, Sentinel Literary Quarterly, River River, The Bombay Review, Bakwa, African Writer, Jalada Africa, Saraba Magazine, The Indianapolis Review, Kissing Dynamite, The Village Square Journal, 20.35 Africa: An Anthology of Contemporary Poetry Vol.II, Black Communion: Poems of 100 New African Poets, From Here to There: A Cross Cultural Poetry Anthology, A Thousand Voices Rising: An Anthology of Contemporary African Poetry, The Solace of Nature: An Anthology of International Poetry, The Bombay Review: An Anthology of Short Fiction and Poetry, among several others. Some of his poems have been translated into Norwegian, French, and Arabic

=== International Poetic Project ===
In the summer of 2015, the third edition of the international poetic project in honor of the legendary Russian poet, singer, songwriter and actor Vladimir Vysotsky was published in the US. The project, which is essentially a world poetry anthology compiled and edited by Marlena Zimna, the Director of Polish Vladimir Vysotsky's Museum in Koszalin, features Nduka's Igbo translations of Vladimir Vysotsky's poems alongside translations in Greek, Hindi, Maori, Xhosa, Meitei, Peru, Fante, Georgian, Cebuano, Maltese, Gujarati, Assamese, French, and several other world languages by notable poets and translators from different parts of the world.

=== Selected Essays ===
- "On Freedom Falls & Contrastive Realism", in My Africa, My City: An Afridiaspora Anthology, 2016
- "Memories in Three Mementoes", in EXPOUND: Issue #9, 2017
- "Art as a Lifeline", in Praxis Magazine Anthology, 2020
- "Redreaming the Sound", in Olongo Africa, 2021
- "An Impromptu Classical Music Session with Cobhams Asuquo", in Márọkọ́, 2022
- "Maiduguri, for Chandos Anthem No. 9", in Lolwe, 2023

== Awards, fellowships, and honors ==
- 2016: Winner of the Korea-Nigeria Poetry Prize
- 2020: Award of Creative Excellence for Waterman (6th ANBUKRAFT)
- 2022: Chrysanthemums for Wide-eyed Ghosts shortlisted for PAWA Poetry Prize
- 2022: The Benjamin Franklin Fellowship at the University of Pennsylvania
- 2023: Booth-Ferris Graduate Fellowship

== Bibliography ==
- Chrysanthemums for Wide-eyed Ghosts (2018)
- Waterman (2020)
- Jazz Negotiations (2026)

== Filmography ==
- 2015: We Wear Purple Robes (Poetry film)
- 2016: Console Me (Short film)
- 2016: Listen (Poetry film)
- 2016: Where the Road Leads (Poetry film)

== Recordings ==
- Choreowaves: African Classical Piano Music (Digital EP)
- Nine Encores (Digital EP)
- The African Serenades

== See also ==
- List of Nigerian film producers
