= Lavaud =

Lavaud is a French surname. Notable people with the surname include:

- Franck Lavaud (1903–1986), Haitian general, politician and President of Haiti
- Jean-Claude Lavaud (1938–2011), French footballer
- Suzanne Lavaud (1903–1996), French librarian

== See also ==
- Sensaud de Lavaud, a French automobile
