= Tiwa Savage =

Nigerian singer and songwriter (born 1980)

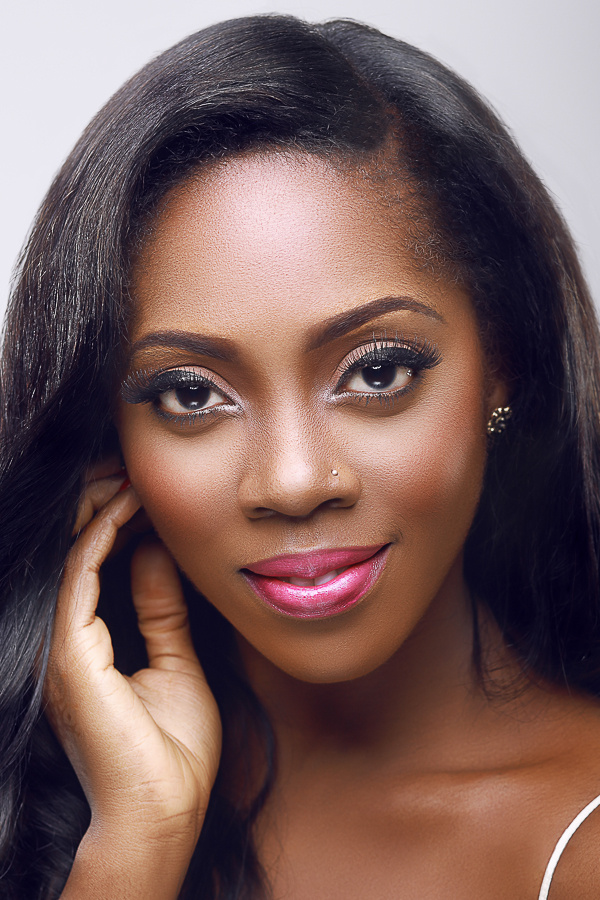
- 2013 studio portrait of Savage
- Born: Tiwatope Omolara Savage; 5 February 1980 (age 46); Isale Eko, Lagos State, Nigeria
- Education: University of Kent, Berklee College of Music
- Occupations: Singer; songwriter; actress
- Notable work: Discography
- Spouse: Tunji Balogun (m. 2013; div. 2018)
- Children: 1
- Awards: Full list
- Musical career
- Genres: Afrobeats; R&B; pop; hip hop; soul
- Instrument: Vocals
- Years active: 1996–present
- Labels: 323; Universal; Motown; Capital; Island

Tiwatope Omolara Savage (born 5 February 1980), known professionally as Tiwa Savage, is a Nigerian singer, songwriter and actress. Savage sings in English, Nigerian Pidgin, and Yoruba; her music is a blend of afrobeats, R&B, afropop, pop and hip-hop. Savage's contributions to the Nigerian music industry have earned her several recognitions.

Born in Isale Eko, she relocated to London at the age of 11 for her secondary education. Five years later, she began her music career doing backup vocals for artists such as George Michael and Mary J. Blige. After participating in the UK edition of The X Factor and graduating from Berklee College of Music, Savage signed a publishing deal with Sony/ATV Music Publishing in 2009. Inspired by the growth of the Nigerian music industry, she moved back to Nigeria and signed with Mavin Records in 2012. Savage made an appearance on the label's 2012 compilation album Solar Plexus.

Her debut studio album, Once Upon a Time, was released on 3 July 2013. It was supported by the singles "Kele Kele Love", "Love Me (3x)", "Without My Heart", "Ife Wa Gbona", "Folarin", "Olorun Mi", and "Eminado". The album was nominated for Best Album of the Year at the 2014 Nigeria Entertainment Awards and for Best R&B/Pop Album at The Headies 2014. On 19 December 2015, Savage released her second studio album R.E.D, which yielded the singles "My Darlin" and "Standing Ovation". The tracks "All Over" and "Ma Lo" served as singles from her six-track debut extended play (EP), Sugarcane, which was released in September 2017. R.E.D and Sugarcane have both been nominated for Best Album at the Nigeria Entertainment Awards.

In November 2018, Savage won Best African Act at the 2018 MTV Europe Music Awards, becoming the first woman to win the category. In May 2019, she announced her record deal with Universal Music Group and exit from Mavin Records. Savage's third studio album, Celia, yielded the singles "Attention", "Dangerous Love", "Koroba", and "Temptation". Her second extended play, Water & Garri, blends Afrobeat with soulful R&B. In March 2022, Savage announced the Water & Garri North American Tour in support of the EP. Her fourth studio album, This One Is Personal, was released in August 2025.

== Life and career ==
=== 1980–2009: Early life, career beginnings and songwriting ===
Tiwatope Savage was born on 5 February 1980, in Isale Eko, Lagos State, Nigeria. Her family relocated to London when she was 11 years old. While attending secondary school, she was a trombone player for her school's orchestra band. Savage graduated with a degree in accounting from the University of Kent, and started working at The Royal Bank of Scotland. She did backup vocals for English singer George Michael at the age of 16, and lent vocals to other musicians such as Mary J. Blige, Chaka Khan, Blu Cantrell, Emma Bunton, Kelly Clarkson, Andrea Bocelli and Ms. Dynamite. Savage enrolled at Berklee College of Music and graduated with a degree in professional music in 2007. While reminiscing about her experiences there, she said she was motivated by the drive and passion of the younger students. She also said she needed the school's atmosphere.

In 2006, Savage participated in the UK edition of The X Factor and advanced to the final 24 but ended up being the 12th person to be evicted. While participating, she had difficulty dealing with the limelight. She said, "You have to always realize that people are watching. When I got the bad news that I wasn't getting through [to the final 12] it was a really painful time. But you still have to learn how to hold that until you get home. Because you don't want to just let everything out. People admire you and want to see that you're strong; they don't want to see you breaking down."

In 2009, Savage signed a publishing deal with Sony/ATV Music Publishing. The deal allowed her to write for Babyface, Kat Deluna, Fantasia, Monica and Mýa. She has received songwriting credits for her contribution to Monica's soul-tinged ballad "Catch Me". Her collaboration with Fantasia on the song "Collard Greens & Cornbread" earned the American recording artist a Grammy nomination in 2010. Savage wrote Jaicko's "Oh Yeah", featuring Snoop Dogg, and Deluna's "Push Push", featuring Akon. She performed background vocals on Whitney Houston's album I Look to You (2009). Inspired by the growth of the Nigerian music industry, Savage moved back to Nigeria and signed with Mavin Records in 2012.

=== 2010–2013: Once Upon a Time, record deal and endorsements ===
This album is straight from my heart and it's something that I've worked so tirelessly for. A lot of people wondered why it took me so long a time to drop my own album. That's because we had to go through a lot of legal processes to clear some of the samples that we used, and that took us some months. Also, we wanted to work with notable producers outside the shores of the country like Oak who produces [for] Rihanna. So, we had to work around his schedule and waited for them to have our time. But this album is something that I really took my time with because I didn't want it to be the usual Nigerian album that contains just party tracks from the beginning till the end.

— Tiwa Savage, speaking to Vanguard about her debut studio album

In December 2011, Savage co-hosted the second season of Nigerian Idol alongside IllRymz. She made her acting debut with Joke Silva and Ireti Doyle in the stage adaptation of For Coloured Girls. Savage established the 323 Entertainment record label with her former manager and husband Tunji "Tee Billz" Balogun, to whom she got engaged on 5 February 2013. She joined Mavin Records in 2012 and was one of the lead acts on the label's compilation album Solar Plexus (2012). While attending Berklee College of Music, she networked with musicians Keith Harris, Derek Pate, Scott Coleman, Radar Ellis, and Darien Dorsey. In an interview with journalist Brenda Pike, she said she collaborated with producers Chuck Harmony, Warren "Oak" Felder, and Sossick, among others. She said her debut studio album would include songs in her native tongue. Savage was featured on the remix of "Oyi" in 2012. Prior to collaborating with Flavour, she recorded her own version of the song.

In celebration of the 52nd anniversary of Nigeria's independence, Savage performed her rendition of "Arise, O Compatriots" for Ndani Sessions. In November 2012, she collaborated with Waje, Praiz, Timi Dakolo and Pamela Egoh on the Ovation Red Carol theme song "Higher". Savage started recording her debut studio album, Once Upon a Time, in 2010. She held an album listening party at the Wheatbaker Hotel in Ikoyi in May 2013. During the listening party, she revealed the entire track list and announced Iceberg Slim, Sarkodie and General Pype as featured acts. The album was made available for digital download on iTunes the day before its official release in Nigeria. Savage named the album Once Upon a Time in order to portray the positive stories about her life. She said she wanted to motivate other upcoming artists by telling them that, once upon a time, she was a little girl in Isale Eko who dreamt of being a star. The album was supported by seven singles—"Kele Kele Love", "Love Me (3x)", "Without My Heart", "Ife Wa Gbona", "Folarin", "Olorun Mi" and "Eminado". It also includes political songs like "Middle Passage", which is about the struggles of African men in a foreign country. Once Upon a Time was nominated for Best Album of the Year at the 2014 Nigeria Entertainment Awards, and for Best R&B/Pop Album at The Headies 2014.

Savage has been involved in many youth empowerment and breast cancer screening projects across Nigeria. She helped raise money for an organisation that builds schools in her hometown. Savage signed an endorsement deal with MTN Nigeria in July 2013, reportedly worth ₦30 million. She also signed endorsement deals with Pepsi, Forte Oil and Maggi.

=== 2014–2016: R.E.D and Roc Nation deal ===
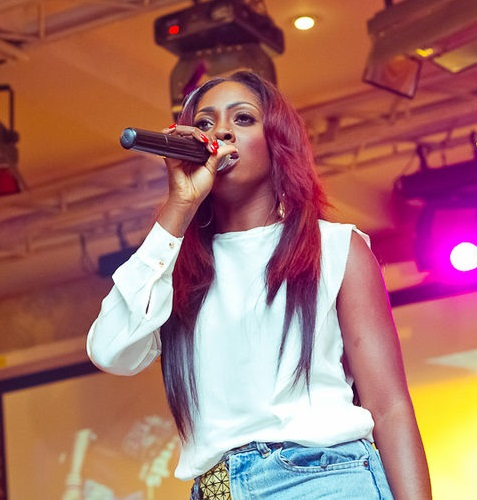
Savage performing at the Mavin Industry Nite Concert in July 2012

On 31 January 2014, Savage released the Spellz-produced track "Love in Yellow" in celebration of Valentine's Day. The song has elements of retro R&B and funk. Savage was featured on Reekado Banks's 2014 single "Turn It Up", which was produced by Don Jazzy. On 1 May 2014, Mavin Records released the Don Jazzy-produced single "Dorobucci", featuring vocals from Savage, Don Jazzy, Dr SID, D'Prince, Reekado Banks, Korede Bello, and Di'Ja. Savage was featured on Patoranking's single "Girlie O", which was produced by WizzyPro and released on 19 May 2014. The music video for the song was filmed in London by Moe Musa.

On 7 June 2014, Savage performed at the 2014 MTV Africa Music Awards alongside Miguel, Flavour N'abania, Davido, Mafikizolo, Uhuru, Oskido and Professor. The Moe Musa-directed video for "Wanted" was released on 28 May 2014. It features Savage wearing a nude body suit and touching herself suggestively. The video's release prompted a huge public backlash across various social networking sites, including Facebook, Twitter and YouTube. In June 2014, Savage collaborated with Mi Casa, Lola Rae, Sarkodie, Diamond Platnumz and Davido on "Africa Rising", a song for DStv's campaign of the same name. The campaign was created to inspire Africans to partake in community-based social investment projects. The accompanying music video for "Africa Rising" was filmed by Callback Dreams. The artists performed the song at the Africa Rising launch ceremony in Mauritius.

On 19 December 2015, Savage released her second studio album R.E.D, which is an acronym for Romance, Expression and Dance. The album features guest appearances from Don Jazzy, Olamide, Dr SID, Iceberg Slim, 2face Idibia, D'Prince, Busy Signal and Reekado Banks. It was primarily produced by Don Jazzy, with additional production from Baby Fresh, Altims, Spellz and P2J. The album was supported by two singles: "My Darlin" and "Standing Ovation". Its deluxe edition was released in February 2016 and features guest vocals from Wizkid and P-Square. R.E.D was nominated for Best Album at the 2016 Nigeria Entertainment Awards. Savage recorded the album while pregnant with her son. The album was made available for free digital streaming on MTN Music on 21 December 2015. Within 24 hours of its release, it became the music platform's most-streamed album. The album was promoted through the website i-am-red.com.

In June 2016, there were reports in the media that Savage had signed a management and publishing deal with Roc Nation. On 29 July 2016, she made it official by announcing the deal through her Instagram account, making her the first Nigerian artist to be signed to the label.

=== 2017–2019: Sugarcane, MTV EMA, and UMG record deal ===
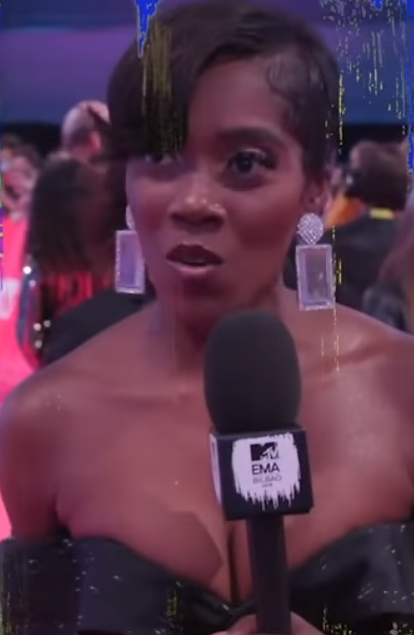
Savage being interviewed at the 2018 MTV EMAs

Savage performed on the Liberty Stage of Jay Z's Made in America Festival. During her performance, she brought out Young Paris for a performance of "Best of Me" (Remix). On 22 September 2017, Savage released her debut extended play (EP), Sugarcane, which features collaborations with producers and guest artists such as Wizkid, Spellz, Baby Fresh, Maleek Berry and P2J. The EP explores themes of love and was recorded in English and Yoruba. It was nominated for Best Album of the Year at the 2018 Nigeria Entertainment Awards. Savage revealed to The Fader magazine that she did not have any plans to release Sugarcane, but decided to put out the project after recording so much music for her upcoming album. Sugarcane is a mixture of Afropop, funk, house, pop music, R&B and trap.

On 24 August 2018, Savage headlined a concert at The O2's Indigo venue; general admission tickets sold out hours before the event. The concert featured additional performances from Don Jazzy, Reekado Banks, Di'Ja, Dr SID, WSTRN, Awilo Longomba, Mystro, and the Alternate Sound Band. Prior to the concert, Savage held a pop-up shop on Berwick Street. In November 2018, Savage won Best African Act at the 2018 MTV Europe Music Awards, becoming the first woman to win the category. On 15 November 2018, she released the melodic track "One", which was produced by Killer Tunez and touches upon themes of gratitude. Writing for Legit.ng, Akinpelu Oluwafunmilayo described the song as an "Afrobeat song with a soft tempo and smooth rhythmical flow". On 2 December 2018, Savage performed at the 2018 Global Citizen Festival: Mandela 100, which took place at the FNB Stadium in Johannesburg, South Africa. News about her performance at the festival was first reported in July 2018.

The video for "One" was released on 7 December 2018. Directed by Clarence Peters, it was filmed at a local beach in Osoroko, Lagos. In January 2019, YouTube took down the video for "One" following an accusation of copyright violations. Due to not being able to verify a copyright violation, YouTube restored the video on 2 March 2019. On 13 March, Savage was added to the lineup of artists who performed at the 2019 Wireless Festival. On 2 May 2019, Universal Music Group announced the signing of Savage to a seven-year publishing and distribution deal. It was also revealed that she left Mavin Records. Efe Ogbeni of Regime Music Societe and Vannessa Amadi-Ogbonna will be responsible for executive producing all of her projects under the label. Savage's future music will be released through the label's operations in more than 60 countries.

In July 2019, Savage was featured on "Keys to the Kingdom", a track she co-wrote for Beyoncé's soundtrack album The Lion King: The Gift. She appeared on the track alongside Mr Eazi. On 5 September 2019, Savage released "49-99", her first single with Motown Records. The song references the line "49 sitting, 99 standing" from Fela Anikulapo Kuti's 1978 hit "Shuffering and Shmiling". Described as a blend of afrobeat, R&B and pop music, "49-99" features syncopated percussion, humming background harmonies and crisp snares. The Meji Alabi-directed video for "49-99" features colorful imagery and symbolism. One of the video's scenes references the iconic portraits of Congolese schoolgirls taken in 1972 by photographer Eliot Elisofon. Another scene, in which Savage is laid out with lengthy braids, is reminiscent of Diana Ross' flower-accented look from the late 1960s.

On 19 November 2019, Savage released the Black Jheerze-produced track "Attention" and the Pheelz-produced track "Owo Mi Da". In "Attention", she scolds her love interest for the lack of attention he is putting into their relationship, while in "Owo Mi Da", she makes cut throat remarks at an unnamed borrower. Savage performed background vocals on "Èkó", a slow-burning ballad from Coldplay's eighth studio album Everyday Life (2019).

==== "Queen of Afrobeats" honorific title ====
In mid-2017, as Savage was preparing to release Sugarcane, she began to be called the Queen of Afrobeats by the media. Glamour magazine in South Africa used that title in 2018, BellaNaija and the Namibian Sun used the term in 2019 as Savage joined Motown, The New York Times reported her as Queen of Afrobeats in 2020, and Allure magazine declared Savage the Queen of Afrobeats in a May 2021 cover story. Prior to this, May7ven and Yemi Alade had been separately called the Queen of Afrobeats by media sources. Savage herself has denied the title, saying that other women performing in the genre, including Alade and Simi, had been working just as hard to deserve the honor. In June 2022 when Tems swept the BET Awards, fans of Tems argued with fans of Savage on social media regarding which singer was the Queen of Afrobeats.

=== 2020–2022: Billboard cover story, charity foundation, Celia, Water & Garri, and honorary degree ===
In May 2020, Savage was featured on Billboard magazine's cover story, titled "Africa Now", alongside Mr Eazi and Davido. The cover story features photography by Lakin Ogunbanwo and Seye Isikalu, and styling by Daniel Obasi and Quinton Faulkner. The story was written by Gail Mitchell and features interviews with the three artists. Conducted over a video conference call, the artists addressed several topics, including life under quarantine and afrobeats as a category.

In July 2020, Savage launched the We Are Tired charity foundation, an initiative aimed at providing legal support and representation to victims of sexual assault in Nigeria. The foundation began as a hashtag she used to express her dissatisfaction with authorities regarding rape negligence. Savage had meetings with the Lagos State police commissioner to help publicize phone numbers for victims to report sexual offences.

On 18 August 2020, Savage released the track list for her third studio album Celia, and announced that it would be released on 28 August 2020. The album comprises 13 tracks and features collaborations with artists such as Sam Smith, Stefflon Don, Davido, Naira Marley, and Hamzaa, among others. Savage named the album Celia in order to pay homage to her mother and to women all around the world. In July 2020, Savage told France 24 that the album is a mixture of Afrobeat, soul, and R&B. Celia produced four singles: "Attention", "Dangerous Love", "Koroba", and "Temptation". It was ranked 10th on Time magazine's list of the 10 Best Albums of 2020. In a review for Essence magazine, Antoinette Isama described the album as a "sonic journey" and said it "shows us how Savage stays in the pocket of what makes listening to R&B so warm, with the complex melodies and messages that align with afrobeat music".

Savage's second extended play, Water & Garri, was released on 20 August 2021. The EP comprises five tracks and features guest vocals from Nas, Brandy, Tay Iwar, Rich King, and Amaarae. It was supported by the singles "Tales by Moonlight" and "Somebody's Son"; the latter track features vocals by Brandy and peaked at number 19 on Billboard's Adult R&B Songs chart. Described by Savage as the "most spiritual journey through music so far", the EP blends Afrobeat with soulful R&B. In March 2022, Savage announced the Water & Garri North American Tour in support of the EP; the tour commenced in Brooklyn, New York, on 15 May 2022, and concluded in Toronto, on 19 June 2022. In a review of her Brooklyn show, Variety magazine commended her performance and homage to The Notorious B.I.G.

On 15 July 2022, Savage received an honorary degree from the University of Kent during a graduation ceremony at Canterbury Cathedral. She was awarded a doctor in music award for her inspirational and international career in music. Savage delivered an acceptance speech at the ceremony and sang a rendition of "Optimistic" by Sounds of Blackness.

=== 2023–present: Water & Garri film, coronation performance, and This One Is Personal ===
Hilda Macheso, Ivy Kamanga, Savage, Esther Bonyonga, and Habiba Osman having a discussion about Gender-related violence at the Malawi Human Rights Commission in 2026.

In February 2023, Savage announced on Instagram that she co-produced the film Water and Garri with Meji Alabi. Savage's second extended play, Water & Garri, inspired the film's title. In addition to co-producing the film with Alabi, Savage plays the lead role. Shot in Cape Coast, Ghana, the film also stars Mike Afolarin, Andrew Bunting, and Jemima Osunde in supporting roles. Savage wrote and performed the film's original soundtrack, and served as an executive producer along with Vannessa Amadi-Ogbonna. The film depicts the story of Aisha, a U.S-based fashion designer who returns to her homeland to confront her past guilt.

On 7 May 2023, Savage performed at King Charles III's Coronation Concert, held at Windsor Castle; she wore a custom Lanre da Silva gown that showcased her Nigerian heritage. Savage's performance was praised, but her presence at the event was criticised on social media because of the UK's colonial history in Nigeria. On 26 February 2025, Savage was featured on Craig David's single "Commitment", which debuted and peaked at number 51 on the UK Singles Downloads Chart. Savage released her fourth studio, This One Is Personal, on 29 August 2025. The album has 15 tracks and was released via Empire Distribution. Its lead single, "You 4 Me", was produced by Mystro and contains a sample of Tamia's 1998 single "So Into You".

In March 2026, Savage launched the Tiwa Savage Music Foundation, a non-profit initiative focused on music education and youth development. The foundation and Berklee College of Music held a joint four-day intensive training session for 100 Nigerian musicians in April 2026. Four months later, Savage visited Malawi as part of Spotlight Initiative, a United Nations campaign to end violence against women. During the visit, Savage urged women and girls to speak out against abuse rather than endure it.

== Personal life ==
Savage was married to Tunji "Tee Billz" Balogun. On 23 November 2013, the couple held their traditional marriage at the Ark in Lekki. Their white wedding was held on 26 April 2014, at the Armani Hotel in Dubai. On 1 January 2015, Savage and Balogun announced that they were expecting their first child together. Six months later, Savage gave birth to their son. On 28 April 2016, Balogun accused his wife of infidelity and his mother-in-law of witchcraft. In a 45-minute interview conducted by This Day newspaper and Pulse Nigeria, Savage extensively addressed her husband's lengthy social media posts regarding their marriage. She debunked her husband's infidelity claims and accused him of financial recklessness, drug addiction and abandonment. She said her marriage to him was over.

On 19 July 2021, Savage lost her father to an undisclosed illness.

=== Feud with Seyi Shay and leaked video ===
On 8 June 2021, Savage was involved in a verbal exchange with Seyi Shay at a saloon in Lekki, Lagos. According to Premium Times newspaper, Seyi Shay recorded a diss track in 2017, calling Savage several derogatory names.

In October 2021, Savage told Power 105.1's Angie Martinez that she was blackmailed over a leaked video of herself and her partner having sex. Savage's partner accidentally uploaded the video to Snapchat and took it down almost immediately. However, someone captured the video before it was deleted and threatened to release it if they weren't monetarily compensated. Savage refused to give the person money and instead decided to publicly speak about the leaked video in order to own the narrative. Savage revisited the incident on her 2022 single "Loaded" with Asake.

== Recognition and influence on other artists ==
Savage appeared on BBC's list of the 100 inspirational and innovative women for 2017. She also made the Women4Africa 2022 Goldlist. Artists such as Ayra Starr and Brettina have cited Savage as one of their key musical influences.

== Discography ==
Studio albums

- Once Upon a Time (2013)
- R.E.D (2015)
- Celia (2020)
- This One Is Personal (2025)

== Television ==
Television
Year	Title	Role	Notes	Ref
2013–14	Shuga (season 3)	Sade Banjo	Supporting cast	
2016	Jenifa's Diary (season 3)	Herself	Cameo	
Plays
Year	Title	Role	Notes	Ref
2011	For Colored Girls (Note: For Colored Girls, a Nigerian adaptation of the American stage play For colored girls who have considered suicide / when the rainbow is enuf, should not be confused with Tyler Perry's 2010 film of the same name.)	—N/a	Supporting cast	

== See also ==
- List of awards and nominations received by Tiwa Savage
- Tiwa Savage discography

Media offices
Preceded by M.I and Omawumi (2012)	The Headies host (co hosted with Dr SID); 2013	Succeeded by Toke Makinwa and Basketmouth (2014)
