= Wanted (Tiwa Savage song) =

Song by Tiwa Savage

from the album Once Upon a Time
- Language: English
- Recorded: 2013
- Genre: Afropop; reggae
- Length: 3:30
- Label: Mavin Records
- Songwriters: Tiwa Savage and Tiffany Fred
- Producer: Warren "Oak" Felder

"Wanted" is a song by Nigerian singer Tiwa Savage from her debut studio album, Once Upon a Time (2013). The song was produced by American producer Warren "Oak" Felder and samples the memorable line "out in the streets/they call it murder" from Damian Marley's 2005 single "Welcome to Jamrock". The Moe Musa-directed music video for "Wanted" was released on 27 May 2014. Its release prompted a huge public backlash across various social media sites, including Facebook, Twitter and YouTube.

== Music video ==
=== Background ===
"[Being sexual] is something we're comfortable with behind closed doors but very uncomfortable with in public. But, fortunately, as artists we have the platform to do things that a lot of people might not be able to do. I felt like I was at a stage in my life at which I was very comfortable in my skin."

— Tiwa Savage, on her decision to release the music video.

The accompanying music video for "Wanted" was filmed by Moe Musa. It was released on May 27, 2014 and ran for 3 minutes and 31 seconds. In the video, Savage is seen wearing a nude body suit and mimicking the sexual act of fingering. Throughout the video, she writhed sensually and performed erotically-charged dance moves. In an interview with The Times, Savage said she was content with her figure when she uploaded the video to YouTube. Moreover, she declared her intention to pursue the adult market and explore her life as a woman.

=== Reception ===
Cultural reception to the music video was mixed. Critics who opposed the video argued that Nigerian artists shouldn't emulate sexual images often seen in western media at the expense of tarnishing the morality of the Nigerian culture. Conversely, those in support of the video praised its sexual nature and stance on sexual empowerment. Social critic Charles Novia bluntly described the video as “stupid art”, while public figures such as Uti Nwachukwu, Gbemi Olateru Olagbegi, Dr SID and Toolz described it as brilliant.

In a negative review, an editor for The Sun said the video lacks originality and called it "utterly unoriginal, desperately copycat-ish and incredibly boring."

== Live performances ==
Alongside her former labelmates Dr SID, Di'Ja, Korede Bello, and Reekado Banks, Savage performed "Wanted" during the Road to the MAMAs concert in June 2014. She also performed the song at the 2014 edition of Africa Unplugged, alongside Davido and Diamond Platnumz.

== Accolades ==
"Wanted" earned Savage a nomination for Best Vocal Performance (Female) at The Headies 2014.
