= Spellz =

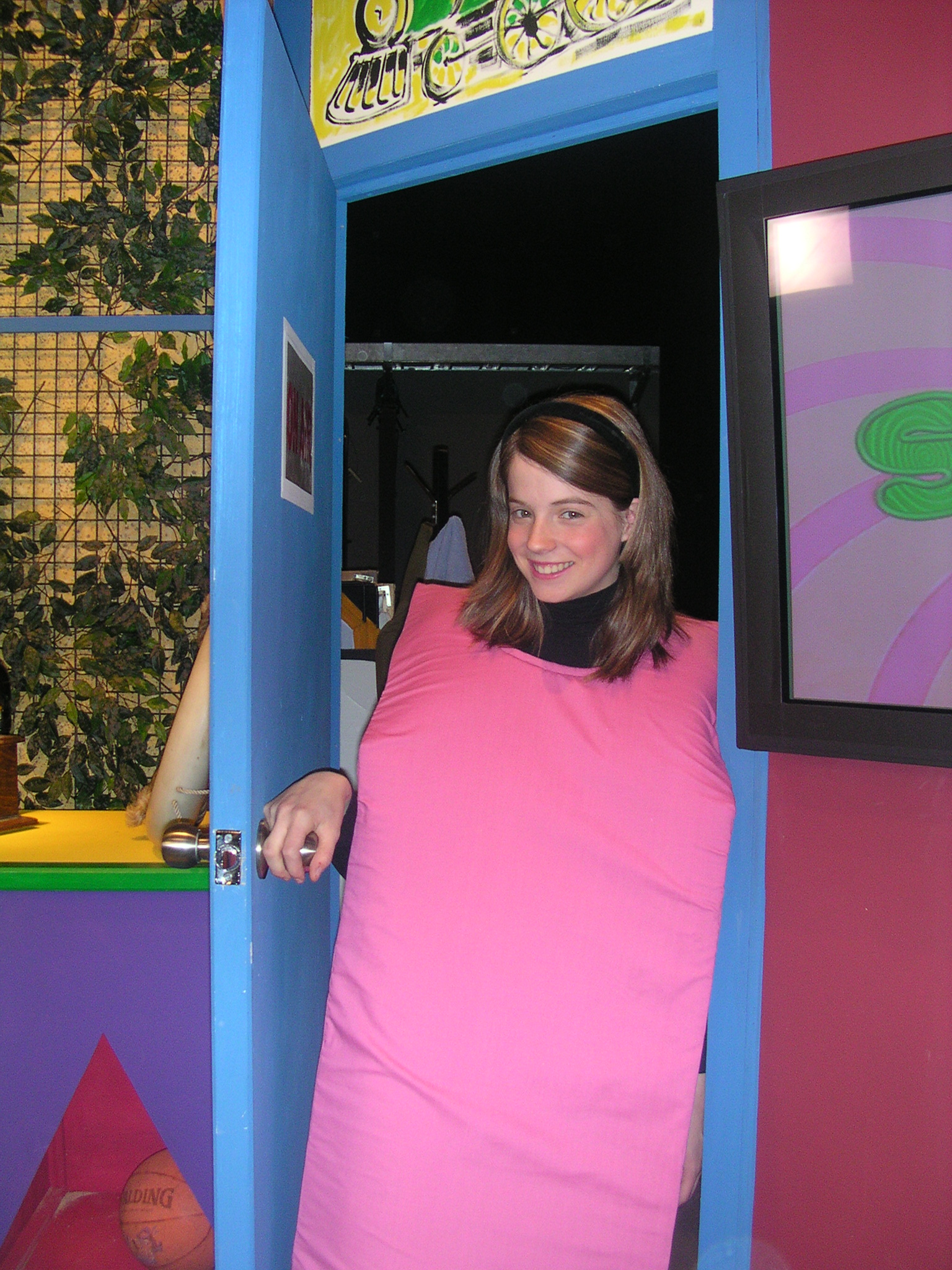
- Bridget Hall, the assistant host of Spellz, prepares in costume for a trick.
- Genre: Magic
- Created by: Hoda Elatawi; Mike Erskine-Kellie; Jay Sankey; David Peck
- Written by: Susan McLennan
- Directed by: Max Maleo
- Starring: Jay Sankey; Bridget Hall
- Country of origin: Canada
- Original language: English
- No. of seasons: 2
- No. of episodes: 52

Production
- Production companies: GAPC Entertainment; TVO Kids

Original release
- Network: TVOKids (2006–2008); Knowledge Network (2006–2009); SCN
- Release: September 2006 – 2008

Spellz was a 2006–2008 magic series featuring famed magician Jay Sankey. Produced by GAPC Entertainment in partnership with TVO Kids, with the participation of Knowledge Network from 2006 to 2009, SCN and the Canadian Television Fund, Spellz was created by Hoda Elatawi, Mike Erskine-Kellie, Jay Sankey and David Peck. The show was directed by Max Maleo, written by Susan McLennan, and executive produced by Ken Stewart, Dan Danko & Tom K. Mason.

In Spellz, Bridget Hall plays "Bridget, the Amazing Kid Assistant", the only other recurring person on the series, beside Sankey. There were kid segments for a second season of the program that were in production during March 2007; however, the scenes with Sankey and Hall were filmed in May; there are 26 episodes in Season 1, airing since September 2006, and there are 26 episodes in Season 2, which began September 2007. Both are available on DVD.

In 2007, Spellz won the Certificate for Creative Excellence in Communications at the U.S. International Film and Video Festival and the Remi award at the Houston International Film Festival in 2008.
