= Meji Alabi =

Nigerian music video director

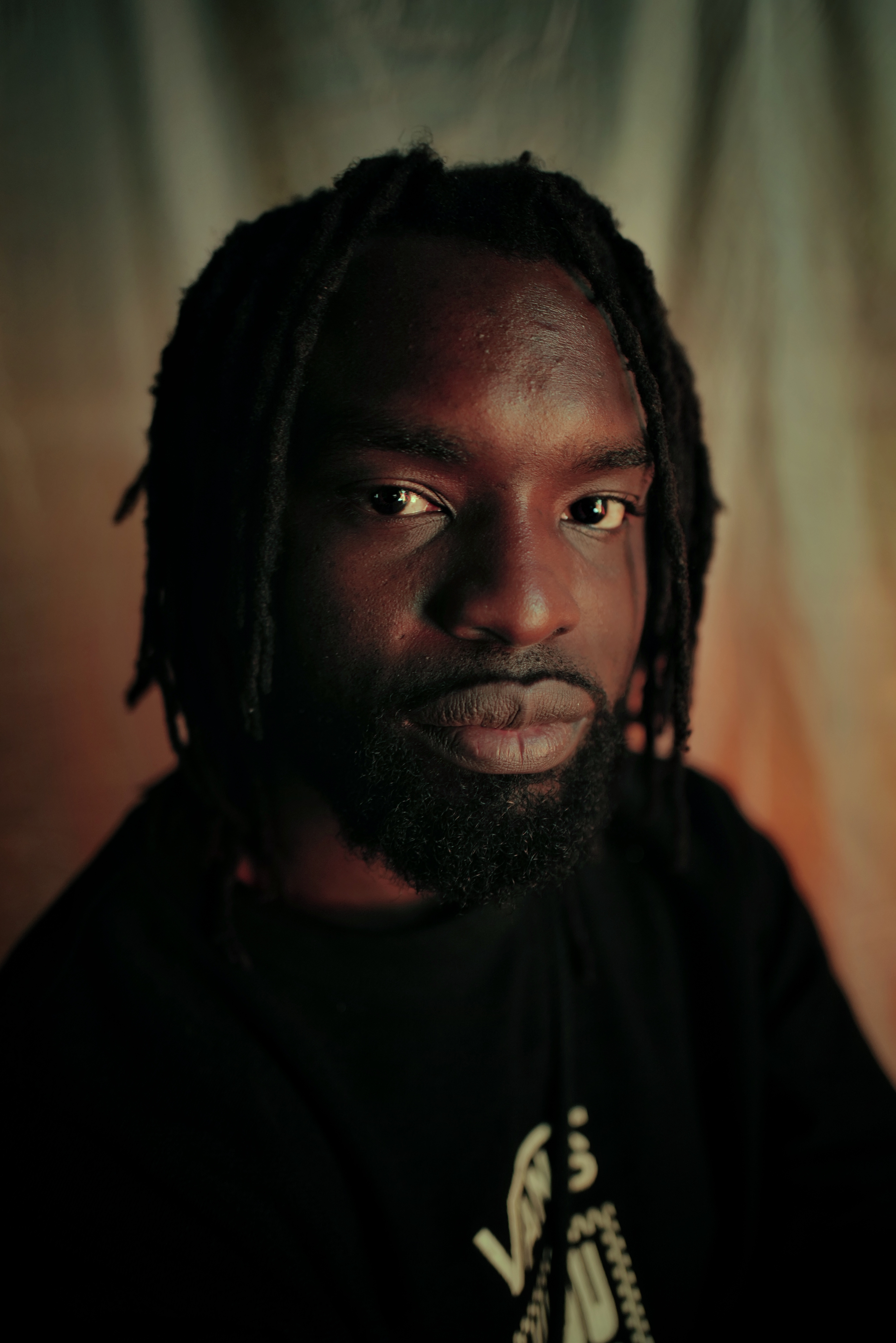
- Alabi in 2022

Background information
- Born: 13 December 1988 (age 37); London, UK
- Origin: Nigeria
- Occupations: Filmmaker, music video director, photographer, producer
- Years active: 2014–present
- Website: mejialabi.com

Meji Alabi (born 13 December 1988) is a Nigerian-British filmmaker, director, photographer and producer. He is a director and has worked alongside Beyonce, Burna Boy, Wizkid,Davido, Tiwa Savage, Popcaan, Goldlink, Koffee and Nasty C. He directed his first feature film in 2024, Water and Garri, starring Tiwa Savage.

== Early life ==
Born on December 13, 1988, in London, Meji spent a lot of his childhood on the move with his father after his parents’ separation in 1989. He shuffled between London, the Bahamas, and Texas, USA. He attended Spring Forest Middle School and Stratford High School both in Houston, Texas. Meji Alabi graduated from the University of West London with a first-class summa cum laude distinction in Accounting and Finance, and also holds a Licensed Vocational Nursing degree from St. Phillips College in San Antonio, Texas.

== Career ==
In 2014, Alabi co-founded JM Films with Jimi Adesanya. JM Films (a subsidiary of Unbound Studios) is a media and production services company specialised in creative visuals, music videos, commercials, movies and television and is based in Lagos, Nigeria. He is also a co-founder of Priorgold Pictures which is a production outfit based in Lagos, Nigeria created to service the needs of the entertainment industry by providing equipment and personnel for the execution of creative visual content.

In 2014, he directed the music video for ‘Murda’ performed by Seyi Shay featuring Patoranking, Shaydee. The success of this video garnered him much attention in the Nigerian music industry and it was nominated in the same year at the MTV Africa Music Awards for Best Video. Also in 2014, he directed the music video for ‘Crazy’ performed by Seyi Shay featuring Wizkid and that video was nominated in 2015 for Best Music Video of the Year (Artist and Director) at the Nigeria Entertainment Awards and also Best Music Video at The Headies 2015.

In 2016, he directed the video for ‘Kontrol’ by Maleek Berry which marked a new wave of him directing music videos for the Nigerian music industry’s elite. In the same year, he directed ‘Aje’ performed by Alikiba which won the Best Music Video award at the Soundcity MVP Awards Festival in 2017.

In 2018, Alabi directed the video for Davido’s single ‘Assurance’ off the ‘A Good Time’.

Since 2018, Alabi has worked with Burna Boy on some of his projects. He directed Pull Up, On The Low, and Gum Body featuring Jorja Smith off Burna Boy's album ‘African Giant’. Meji also directed the videos for Way Too Big, Wonderful, Monsters You Made featuring Chris Martin and Real Life featuring Stormzy off the ‘Twice As Tall’ album.

He has also worked with Wizkid on the Made in Lagos album, and holds directing credits for the music videos for Ginger featuring Burna Boy, No Stress and Smile featuring H.E.R

In 2020, Alabi served as a producer alongside Jimi Adesanya for the Nigerian footage for the Black Is King visual project executively produced by Beyonce Knowles-Carter. He also worked alongside Ibra Ake and Jenn Nkiru to execute the Grammy Award-winning ‘Brown Skin Girl’ music video for which he was credited as co-director.

In 2021, Alabi worked with Black Dog Films as director of the visual project for the ‘Zero Malaria: Draw The Line Against Malaria’ campaign. The movement features Nigerian actress and philanthropist Omotola Jalade-Ekeinde, actor and entrepreneur Osas Ighodaro, Kenyan Olympic Gold-medallist and marathon world record-holder Eliud Kipchoge, South African explorer and mountaineer Saray Khumalo, Nigerian artist Laolu Senbanjo current captain of the South Africa national Rugby team Siya Kolisi, and Rwandan-British choreographer Sherrie Silver.

Alabi directed and co-wrote his first feature film, Water and Garri, starring Tiwa Savage and released in 2024.

In 2026, he directed of the documentary Surviving Biafra: Voices from the Nigerian Civil War, wich explores Nigeria's civil war.

== Videography ==
Title	Year	Artist(s)	Ref(s)
"Murda"	2014	Seyi Shay (feat. Patoranking & Shaydee)	
"Crazy"	2015	Seyi Shay (feat. Wizkid)	
"Satan Be Gone"	2015	Asa	
"Eyo"	2015	Asa	
"Right Now"	2015	Seyi Shay	
"Never Gonna Stop"	2015	Niyola	
"Kontrol"	2016	Maleek Berry	
"Aje"	2016	Alikiba	
"For Life"	2017	Runtown	
"Ma Lo"	2017	Tiwa Savage (feat. Wizkid)	
"All Night"	2017	Yungen (feat. Mr Eazi)	
"Unstable"	2017	Zak Abel	
"Been Callin"	2017	Maleek Berry	
"All Night"	2017	Yungen	
"Sugarcane"	2017	Tiwa Savage	
"Check"	2018	Kojo Funds (feat. Raye)	
"Space For Two"	2018	Mr. Probz	
"Property"	2018	Mr Eazi	
"Fever"	2018	Wizkid	
"Get It Now Remix"	2018	Tiwa Savage ( feat. Omarion)	
"Assurance"	2018	Davido	
"On The Low"	2018	Burna Boy	
"Dun Rich"	2018	Popcaan (feat.Davido)	
"Pon My Mind"	2018	Maleek Berry	
"Jungle"	2018	Nasty C	
"Energy"	2018	Skepta & Wizkid	
"No Crime"	2018	Nonso Amadi	
"London Town"	2018	Mr Eazi feat. Giggs	
"Take Over"		Beatfreakz feat. Mr Eazi, Seyi Shay, Shakka,	
"Dis Love"	2019	DJ Spinall (feat. Wizkid & Tiwa Savage)	
"Sweet in the Middle"	2019	Davido(feat. Naira Marley, Zlatan Ibile & Wurld)	
"Pull Up"	2019	Burna Boy	
"Risky"	2019	Davido (feat. Popcaan)	
"Traffic Jam"	2019	Banx+Ranx feat. Kojo Funds	
"Gum Body"	2019	Burna Boy (feat. Jorja Smith)	
"49-99"	2019	Tiwa Savage	
"Zulu Screams"	2019	Goldlink	
"Body Deep"	2019	Wavy The Creator	
"Hold Me Down"	2019	Eugy feat. Wavy The Creator	
"Wonderful"	2020	Burna Boy	
"4AM"	2020	Manny Norte	
"Dangerous Love"	2020	Tiwa Savage	
"Cause A Commotion"	2020	Bugzy Malone feat. Skip Marley	
"Cool As A Breeze"	2020	Chronixx	
"Monsters You Made"	2020	Burna Boy feat. Chris Martins	
"Cool Me Down"	2020	DJ Tunez (feat. Wizkid)	
"Way Too Big"	2020	Burna Boy	
"Kini Issue"	2020	Runtown	
"No Stress"	2020	Wizkid	
"Smile"	2020	Wizkid (feat. H.E.R)	
"Lento"	2020	Mr Eazi (feat. J Balvin)	
"Real Life"	2020	Burna Boy feat. Stormzy	
"Ginger"	2021	Wizkid (feat. Burna Boy)	
"Hide n' Seek"	2022	Stormzy	
"Aboboyaa"	2023	Popcaan (feat. Burna Boy)	
"Party Girls"	2023	Victoria Monét (feat. Buju Banton)	
"My Love"	2023	Leigh-Anne (feat. Ayra Starr)	

== Commercials ==
Title	Year	Brand(s)	Ref(s)
"Cloth Surgeon"	2016	Complex & Selfridges	
"Npango"	2017	Tigo Nipa	
"S4"	2018	Infinix	
"Fashion Week"	2018	GTB	
"Beauty Launch Campaign"	2019	UOMA	
"Autism: A Mother Knows"	2019	GTB	
"Food & Drink"	2019	GTB	
"Fashion Is Freedom "	2019	GTB	
"No. 5"	2019	Infinix	
"Black Shines Brightest"	2021	Guinness	
"Never Stop Wishing"	2021	OREO	
"Big Deals: Lunch"	2022	KFC	
"Big Deals: Tuesday"	2022	KFC	
"Training Wheels"	2022	Toyota	
"Made to Move"	2022	Cadillac	
"Yummy Snacks"	2023	Fanta	
"Just Add Zero"	2023	Coca-Cola	

== Awards and nominations ==
Year	Event	Prize	Recipient	Result	Ref(s)
2014	MTV Africa Music Awards 2014	Best Video		Nominated	
2015	2015 Nigeria Entertainment Awards	Best Music Video of the year (Artist & Director)	"Crazy" (Seyi Shay)	Nominated	
2015	The Headies 2015	Best Music Video Director	"Seyi Shay (Crazy)" ^{[A]}	Nominated	
2016	The Headies 2016	Best Music Video Director	"Seyi Shay (Crazy)" ^{[A]}	Nominated	
2017	Nigeria Entertainment Awards	Music Video of the Year	"Seyi Shay(Yolo Yolo)"	Won	
2017	Soundcity MVP Awards Festival	Best Music Video	"Alikiba (Aje)" ^{[A]}	Won	
2018	Nigeria Entertainment Awards	Best Music Video of the year (Artist & Director)	"Malo" (Tiwa Savage)	Nominated	
2018	The Headies 2018	Best Music Video Director	"Tiwa Savage (Malo)" ^{[A]}	Nominated	
2020	The Headies 2020	Best Music Video Director	"Wizkid (Smile)" ^{[A]}	Nominated	
2020	Soundcity MVP Awards Festival	Video Of The Year	"Tiwa Savage (49-99)"	Won	
