= Rema discography =

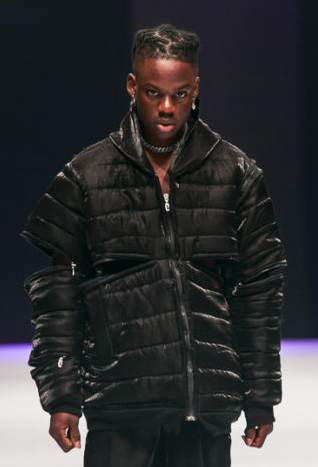
- Rema in 2019
- Studio albums: 2
- Extended plays: 5
- Singles: 39
- Music videos: 20
- Compilation albums: 1

The discography of Rema, a Nigerian Afrobeats singer, consists of two studio albums, five EPs, thirty-nine singles (including two as a featured artist), and 20 music videos. Rema started his music career at age 18. He signed with D'Prince's Jonzing World, an imprint of Don Jazzy's Mavin Records in 2019. His self-titled debut extended play was released in August of that year and peaked atop the Apple Music Nigeria charts.

The EP spawned the single "Dumebi", which was accompanied by a music video that featured a cameo appearance from Diana Eneje and has garnered over 70 million views on YouTube as of 2021. Two further EPs—Freestyle and Bad Commando—preceded the release of his debut studio album, Rave & Roses in 2022. The album debuted ten songs on the US Billboard Afrobeats Chart upon release. Its second single, "Calm Down" soon gained viral recognition; a remix with American singer Selena Gomez was released August 26, 2022. The remix peaked at number three on the Billboard Hot 100 and remained on the chart for 57 weeks, topped many international charts, and set or broke various records for Afrobeats music. By November 2022, Rema was recognized for his songs achieving one billion streams worldwide. He then released his fourth EP, Ravage (2023).

== Albums ==
=== Studio albums ===
Title	Album details	Peak chart positions								Certifications
Title	Album details	NG	BEL	CAN	FRA	NLD	SWI	UK	US	Certifications
Rave & Roses	Released: 25 March 2022; Label: Jonzing World, Mavin; Formats: Digital download, streaming	2	189	15	31	13	—	—	81	MC: Platinum; RIAA: Gold; SNEP: Gold
Heis	Released: 10 July 2024; Label: Jonzing World, Mavin; Formats: Digital download, streaming	1	161	—	136	—	99	90	—	
"—" denotes a recording that did not chart or was not released in that territory.

=== Compilation albums ===
Title	Album details	Peak chart positions
Title	Album details	NG
Rema Compilation	Released: 9 July 2020; Label: Jonzing World, Mavin; Format: Digital download, streaming	61 (Note: Charted in 2025.)

== Extended plays ==
Title	EP details	Peak chart positions
Title	EP details	NG
Rema	Released: 22 March 2019; Label: Jonzing World, Mavin; Format: Digital download, streaming	—
Freestyle	Released: 19 June 2019; Label: Jonzing World, Mavin; Format: Digital download, streaming	—
Bad Commando	Released: 4 October 2019; Label: Jonzing World, Mavin; Format: Digital download, streaming	—
Ravage	Released: 27 October 2023; Label: Jonzing World, Mavin; Format: Digital download, streaming	1
E-Mortal Boy	Released: 20 November 2026; Label: Jonzing World, Mavin; Format: Digital download, streaming	—

== Singles ==
=== As lead artist ===
Title	Year	Peak chart positions										Certifications	Album
Title	Year	NG	BEL (WA)	CAN	FRA	GER	NLD	SPA	SWI	UK	US	Certifications	Album
"Dumebi"	2019	—	—	—	—	—	—	—	—	—	—	RCN: Gold; BPI: Silver; IFPI SWI: Gold; SNEP: Platinum	Rema
"Why"	2019	—	—	—	—	—	—	—	—	—	—		Rema
"Corny"	2019	—	—	—	—	—	—	—	—	—	—	SNEP: Gold	Rema
"Boulevard"	2019	—	—	—	—	—	—	—	—	—	—		Freestyle
"American Love"	2019	—	—	—	—	—	—	—	—	—	—		Freestyle
"Spiderman"	2019	—	—	—	—	—	—	—	—	—	—		Freestyle
"Trap Out the Submarine"	2019	—	—	—	—	—	—	—	—	—	—		Freestyle
"Bad Commando"	2019	—	—	—	—	—	—	—	—	—	—		Bad Commando
"Lady"	2019	—	—	—	—	—	—	—	—	—	—		Bad Commando
"Rewind"	2019	—	—	—	—	—	—	—	—	—	—		Bad Commando
"Spaceship Jocelyn"	2019	—	—	—	—	—	—	—	—	—	—		Bad Commando
"Dumebi Remix" (featuring Becky G)	2020	—	—	—	—	—	—	—	—	—	—		Non-album single
"Beamer (Bad Boys)" (with Rvssian)	2020	—	—	—	—	—	—	—	—	—	—	RCN: Gold	Rema Compilation
"Rainbow"	2020	—	—	—	—	—	—	—	—	—	—		Non-album singles
"Fame"	2020	—	—	—	—	—	—	—	—	—	—		Non-album singles
"Ginger Me"	2020	—	—	—	—	—	—	—	—	—	—	TCSN: Silver	Rema Compilation
"Alien"	2020	—	—	—	—	—	—	—	—	—	—		Rema Compilation
"Woman"	2020	—	—	—	—	—	—	—	—	—	—		Rema Compilation
"Peace of Mind"	2020	—	—	—	—	—	—	—	—	—	—		Non-album singles
"Bounce"	2021	—	—	—	—	—	—	—	—	—	—		Non-album singles
"Soundgasm"	2021	3	—	—	179	—	—	—	—	—	—	TCSN: Gold; BPI: Silver; IFPI SWI: Gold; NVPI: Gold; SNEP: Platinum	Rave & Roses
"44" (featuring Bad Gyal)	2021	—	—	—	—	—	—	17	—	—	—	PROMUSICAE: Platinum	Warm Up
"Calm Down" (solo or remix with Selena Gomez)	2022	17	1	1	2	15	1	23	1	3	3	TCSN: 2× Platinum; ARIA: 8× Platinum; BEA: 2× Platinum; BPI: 3× Platinum; BVMI: Platinum; FIMI: 3× Platinum; IFPI SWI: 4× Platinum; MC: Diamond; NVPI: Gold; PROMUSICAE: 4× Platinum; RIAA: 4× Platinum; SNEP: Diamond	Rave & Roses
"Rizzla" (with The Martinez Brothers and Gordo)	2022	—	—	—	—	—	—	—	—	—	—		Rave & Roses
"FYN" (featuring AJ Tracey)	2022	—	—	—	—	—	—	—	—	—	—		Rave & Roses
"Breathe Anthem" (with Breathe Music WA and Mani Lapussh)	2022	—	—	—	—	—	—	—	—	—	—		Non-album singles
"Only You" (with Stany and Offset)	2022	—	—	—	—	—	—	—	—	—	—		Non-album singles
"Soweto" (with Victony, Tempoe and Don Toliver)	2023	4	—	76	—	—	46	—	29	65	—	TCSN: 3× Platinum; BPI: Gold	Outlaw
"Charm"	2023	1	—	—	77	—	— (Note: "Charm" did not enter the Dutch Single Top 100, but peaked at number 2 on the Dutch Single Tip chart.)	—	80	—	—	TCSN: 2× Platinum; SNEP: Gold	Rave & Roses
"Bubalu" (with Feid)	2023	—	—	—	—	—	—	23	—	—	—	PROMUSICAE: Gold; RIAA: Gold; RIAA: 2× Platinum (Latin)	Mor, No Le Temas a la Oscuridad
"Benin Boys" (with Shallipopi)	2024	1	—	—	—	—	—	—	—	—	—	TCSN: 2× Platinum	Heis
"HeHeHe"	2024	—	—	—	—	—	—	—	—	—	—	TCSN: Platinum	Heis
"Baby (Is It a Crime)"	2025	1	—	98	196	—	—	—	—	53	—		Non-album singles
"Bout U"	2025	2	—	—	—	—	—	—	—	—	—		Non-album singles
"Kelebu"	2025	5	—	—	—	—	—	—	—	—	—		Non-album singles
"Fun"	2025	1	—	—	—	—	—	—	—	—	—		Non-album singles
"Goals" (with Lisa and Anitta)	2026	62	—	—	—	—	—	—	—	—	—		Official FIFA World Cup 2026 Album
"Tea"	2026	3	—	—	—	—	—	—	—	—	—		E-Mortal Boy
"Oh No"	2026	—	—	—	—	—	—	—	—	—	—		E-Mortal Boy
"—" denotes a recording that did not chart or was not released in that territory.

=== As featured artist ===
List of singles as featured artist
Title	Year	Peak Position				Certifications	Album
Title	Year	NGR	FRA	NZ Hot	US World	Certifications	Album
"Pretty Girl" (Ice Spice featuring Rema)	2023	18	—	24	6		Non-album single
"Who's Dat Girl" (Ayra Starr featuring Rema)	2025	2	—	—	9	TCSN: Platinum	Starr Girl
"For Her" (Trippie Redd featuring Rema)	2026	—	—	—	—		NDA
"Best" (Tiakola featuring Rema)	2026	—	30	—	—		WpointM
"—" denotes a recording that did not chart or was not released in that territory.

== Other charted songs ==
List of other charted songs
Title	Year	Peak Position											Album
Title	Year	NGR	CAN	IRE	NZ Hot	NLD	SA	UK	UK Afro	US	US Afro	WW	Album
"Jealousy" (FKA Twigs featuring Rema)	2022	—	—	—	40	—	—	—	—	—	—	—	Caprisongs
"Ozeba"	2025	3	—	—	—	—	—	—	16	—	19	—	Heis
"Secondhand" (Don Toliver featuring Rema)	2026	54	32	51	5	10	65	65	—	29	—	39	Octane
"—" denotes a recording that did not chart or was not released in that territory.

== Guest appearances ==
List of non-single guest appearances
Title	Year	Other artist(s)	Album
"Jealousy"	2022	FKA Twigs	Caprisongs
"Compromise"	2022	Fireboy DML	Playboy
"Another Life"	2023	PinkPantheress	Heaven Knows
"Fi Kan We Kan"	2024	Bnxn	Captain
"Favorite Girl"	2024	Darkoo	Sexy Girl Summer (Vol. 1)
"Secondhand"	2026	Don Toliver	Octane
"Moviestar"	2026	Sofiane Pamart	Movie
"For Her"	2026	Trippie Redd	NDA (album)
"Best"	2026	Tiakola	WpointM

== Official videos ==
- "Dumebi" (2019)
- "Bad Commando" (2019)
- "Lady" (2019)
- "Beamer (Bad Boys)" (2020)
- "Ginger Me" (2020)
- "Woman" (2020)
- "Bounce" (2020)
- "Soundgasm" (2021)
- "Calm Down" (2022)
- "FYN" (2022)
- "Holiday" (2023)
- "Charm" (2023)
- "HOV" (2023)
- "Trouble Maker" (2023)
- "DND" (2023)
- "Benin Boys" (2024)
- "Hehehe" (2024)
- "Azaman" (2024)
- "Ozeba" (2024)
- "Baby (Is It a Crime)" (2025)
- "Fun" (2025)
- "Tea" (2026)
- "Oh No" (2026)
