= Thisizlondon production discography =

Thisizlondon discography
- Studio albums: 17
- EPs: 5
- Compilation albums: 1
- Singles: 17

This is a discography of production by Thisizlondon, a Nigeria record producer from Kaduna State.

== Albums/EPs ==
Artist	Album/EP	Release date	Certifications	Label	Notes
Crayon	Cray Cray	12 July 2019		Mavin Records; Blowtime Entertainment	Co-producer
Crayon	Twelve A.M	26 March 2021		Mavin Records; Blowtime Entertainment	Co-producer
Rema	Bad Commando	27 September 2019		Mavin Records	Co-producer
Rema	Rave & Roses	25 March 2022		Mavin Records	Lead producer
Alpha P	King of the Wolves	15 November 2019		Universal Music Group Nigeria	Co-producer
Dr SID	The Interesting	7 May 2020		Mavin Records	Co-producer
Ceeza Milli	Diamond in the Rough	29 May 2020		Aristokrat Records	Co-producer
Ricky Tyler	Small World	17 July 2020		Universal Music South Africa	Co-producer
Tiwa Savage	Celia	27 August 2020		Motown; Island; Universal; Capitol	Co-producer
Wizkid	Made in Lagos	30 October 2020	BPI: Silver; MC: Gold; RIAA: Gold	Starboy Entertainment; RCA Records	Co-producer
DJ Tunez & J. Anthoni	All You Need	23 March 2021		BT Music Worldwide	Co-producer
Ayra Starr	19 & Dangerous	6 August 2021		Mavin Records	Co-producer
Johnny Drille	Before We Fall Asleep	3 September 2021		Mavin Records	
Ladipoe	Providence	4 November 2021		Mavin Records	Co-producer
Black Sherif	The Villain I Never Was	6 October 2022		Blacko Management; Empire	Co-producer
Marvel Studios	Black Panther: Wakanda Forever – Music from and Inspired By	4 November 2022		Roc Nation; Def Jam; Hollywood	Co-producer
Kel-P	Bully Season Vol.1	24 February 2023		Jones Worldwide; Virgin Music France; Universal Music France	Co-producer
Ayra Starr	The Year I Turned 21	31 May 2024		Mavin Records	Co-producer
Rema	Heis (album)	10 July 2024		Mavin Records	Co-producer

== Singles produced ==
Title	Year	Album	Release date
"Turn Up" (DJ Tunez)	2018	Non-album single	
"Shima" (Crayon)	2020	Non-album single	
"Sometime" (Crayon)	2020	Non-album single	
"On Code" (Crayon)	2020	Non-album single	
"Do Me" (Crayon)	2020	Non-album single	
"Koroba" (Tiwa Savage)	2020	Celia	27 August 2020
"Temptation" (Tiwa Savage)	2020	Celia	27 August 2020
"Mystery Girl" (Johnny Drille)	2020	Non-album single	
"River" (DJ Tunez & J. Anthoni)	2021	All You Need	23 March 2021
"Soundgasm" (Rema)	2021	Rave & Roses	25 March 2022
"Bloody Samaritan" (Ayra Starr)	2021	19 & Dangerous	6 August 2021
"Afro Jigga" (Ladipoe)	2021	Providence	4 November 2021
"Calm Down" (Rema)	2022	Rave & Roses	25 March 2022
"late4dinner" (Azanti)	2022	TBA	
"Bout U" (Rema)	2025	Non-album single	11 April 2025
" Massoko Na Mabele" (Théodora feat. London)	2025	Méga BBL	29 May 2025
"FUN" (Rema)	2025	Non-album single	5 September 2025
