= Rave & Roses World Tour =

2022 concert tour by Rema

Rave & Roses Tour
- Tour by Rema
- Location: O₂ Brixton Academy, London
- Associated album: Rave & Roses
- Start date: 29 April 2022
- End date: 4 September 2022
- Legs: 3
- Producer: Duke Concept (North America)

Rema concert chronology
- Rave & Roses World Tour (2022); Heis World Tour (2025)

The Rave & Roses Tour was the first major concert tour by Nigerian singer-songwriter Rema, launched in support of his debut studio album Rave & Roses (2022). The tour featured performances across Africa, Europe, and North America, and played a significant role in expanding his international audience.

== Background ==
Following the release of Rema's debut studio album Rave & Roses on 25 March 2022, He announced plans for his first world tour to promote the project. The album featured guest appearances from 6lack, Chris Brown, AJ Tracey, and Yseult, and was marketed as a blend of Afrobeats with influences from Arabian and Indian music, a style Rema dubbed "Afrorave".

The first leg of the tour began in Africa, with an opening performance at the R&G Arena in Lusaka, Zambia, on 29 April 2022. Additional African dates included stops in Nairobi, Kenya, and Johannesburg, South Africa.

The European leg featured appearances at major festivals including We Love Green in Paris, Wireless Festival in London, and Afro Nation Portugal, alongside headline shows in Brussels, Rotterdam, and Oslo. His London show at the O₂ Brixton Academy included guest performances by Fireboy DML, UK rapper Dave, and Nigerian artist Victony.

The North American leg, produced by Duke Concept, was announced in May 2022 and included 14 shows across the United States. It began in Seattle on 11 August 2022 and concluded in Minneapolis on 4 September 2022, with stops in major cities including Los Angeles, New York, and Atlanta. The combination of festival appearances and headline shows reflected Rema's strategy of reaching diverse audiences while promoting Rave & Roses as a global Afrobeats record.

== Legs and notable performances ==
=== Africa and Europe ===
The African leg included stops in Zambia, Kenya, and South Africa, while the European leg featured shows in France, Belgium, the Netherlands, Portugal, and the United Kingdom. In November 2022, Rema performed at the O₂ Brixton Academy in London, where he was joined by guest artists Fireboy DML, UK rapper Dave, and Victony.

=== North America ===
The North American leg was produced by Duke Concept and comprised 14 shows between 11 August and 4 September 2022, starting in Seattle and ending in Minneapolis.

== Set list ==
While the set list varied by location, common songs performed included:

- "Calm Down"
- "Soundgasm"
- "Time N Affection"
- "Dumebi"

== Tour dates ==
Date	City	Venue	Country
29 April 2022	Lusaka	R&G Arena	Zambia
7 May 2022	Nairobi	Rema MNE FEST	Kenya
15 May 2022	Las Vegas	Chop Vegas	United States
4 June 2022	Paris	We Love Green Festival	France
17 June 2022	Cambridge	Strawberries & Creem Festival	United Kingdom
19 June 2022	Malta	DLT Brunch	Malta
25 June 2022	Brussels	Couleur Café Festival	Belgium
26 June 2022	Rotterdam	Oh My Festival	Netherlands
28 June 2022	Sandvika	Kadetten Festival	Norway
1 July 2022	Portugal	Afro Nation Portugal†	Portugal
8 July 2022	London	Wireless Festival	United Kingdom
11 August 2022	Seattle	Neumos	United States
13 August 2022	San Francisco	August Hall	United States
14 August 2022	Los Angeles	Echoplex	United States
18 August 2022	Denver	Bluebird Theater	United States
20 August 2022	Houston	House of Blues	United States
21 August 2022	Dallas	Echo Lounge & Music Hall	United States
24 August 2022	Atlanta	Center Stage	United States
26 August 2022	Minneapolis	Pour House	United States
27 August 2022	Chicago	Park West / The Promontory	United States
28 August 2022	Columbus	The KING of CLUBS	United States
30 August 2022	Philadelphia	The Foundry at The Fillmore	United States
1 September 2022	Silver Spring	The Fillmore	United States
2 September 2022	New York City	Irving Plaza	United States
3 September 2022	Cambridge, MA	The Sinclair	United States

- Denotes “Rema MNE FEST” in Kenya—presumably a festival named after the artist.
- † Represents a festival in Portugal (Afro Nation Portugal).
