= List of awards and nominations received by Rema =

Rema awards and nominations
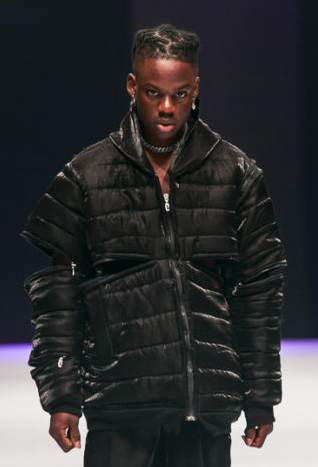
Awards and nominations
Award	Wins	Nominations
American Music Awards	0	1
BET	0	2
Billboard	2	6
Grammy	0	1
MOBO	0	2
MTV Europe	1	2
MTV VMA	1	4

Totals (Note: Certain award groups do not simply award one winner. They acknowledge several different recipients, have runners-up, and have third place. Since this is a specific recognition and is different from losing an award, runner-up mentions are considered wins in this award tally. For simplification and to avoid errors, each award in this list has been presumed to have had a prior nomination.)
- Wins: 23
- Nominations: 55

Nigerian singer-songwriter Rema has received numerous awards and honorary accolades. His accolades includes 19 Headies Music Awards 1 MTV EMA Award and 1MTV VMA '.

== Awards and nominations ==
Awards in certain categories do not have prior nominations and only winners are announced by the jury.

Awards and nominations received by Rema
Award	Year	Category	Recipient(s) or nominee(s)	Result	Ref.
African Entertainment Awards USA	2021	Song of the Year	"Woman"	Nominated	
AFRIMMA	2023	Crossing Boundaries with Music Award	Himself	Won	
AFRIMMA	2023	Artist of the Year	Himself	Won	
AFRIMMA	2026	Artist of the Year	Himself	Won	
AFRIMMA	2026	Best African Artiste, Duo or Group in African R&B & Soul	Himself	Won	
AFRIMMA	2026	Best Male Artist in Western Africa	Himself	Won	
AFRIMMA	2026	R&B & Soul award	"Baby (Is It a Crime)"	Won	
American Music Awards	2025	Best Afrobeat Artist	Himself	Nominated	
American Music Awards	2026	Best Afrobeat Artist	Himself	Pending	
BET Awards	2019	Best New International Act	Himself	Nominated	
BET Awards	2020	Best International Act	Himself	Nominated	
BET Awards	2025	Best International Act	Himself	Nominated	
Billboard Music Awards	2023	Top Afrobeats Song	"Soweto" (Victony feat. Rema, Tempoe and Don Toliver)	Nominated	
Billboard Music Awards	2023	Top Afrobeats Song	"Calm Down (Remix)" (featuring Selena Gomez)	Won	
Billboard Music Awards	2023	Top Collaboration	"Calm Down (Remix)" (featuring Selena Gomez)	Nominated	
Billboard Music Awards	2023	Top Global 200 Song	"Calm Down (Remix)" (featuring Selena Gomez)	Nominated	
Billboard Music Awards	2023	Top Afrobeats Artist	Himself	Nominated	
Billboard Music Awards	2024	Top Afrobeats Artist	Himself	Nominated	
BreakTudo Awards	2022	International Rising Artist	Himself	Nominated	
Brit Awards	2024	International Song of The Year	"Calm Down (Remix)" (featuring Selena Gomez)	Nominated	
City People Music Awards	2019	Most Promising Act of the Year	Himself	Nominated	
City People Music Awards	2019	Revelation of the Year	Himself	Won	
City People Music Awards	2019	Best New Act of the Year	Himself	Nominated	
Edison Award	2021	Edison Jazz/World – World	Rema Compilation	Nominated	
The Future Awards Africa	2020	Young Person of the Year	Himself	Nominated	
The Future Awards Africa	2020	Music	Himself	Won	
Grammy Awards	2025	Global Album	Heis	Nominated	
iHeartRadio Music Awards	2023	Best Music Video	"Calm Down (Remix)" (featuring Selena Gomez)	Nominated	
iHeartRadio Music Awards	2024	Best Collaboration	"Calm Down (Remix)" (featuring Selena Gomez)	Won	
iHeartRadio Music Awards	2024	Song of The Year	"Calm Down (Remix)" (featuring Selena Gomez)	Nominated	
iHeartRadio Music Awards	2024	Pop Song of The Year	"Calm Down (Remix)" (featuring Selena Gomez)	Nominated	
iHeartRadio Music Awards	2024	Best New Pop Artist	Himself	Nominated	
iHeartRadio Music Awards	2024	Afrobeats Artist of The Year	Himself	Nominated	
MTV Africa Music Awards	2021	Best Male	Himself	Nominated	
MTV Europe Music Awards	2020	Best African Act	Himself	Nominated	
MTV Europe Music Awards	2023	Best Afrobeats	"Calm Down (Remix)" (featuring Selena Gomez)	Won	
MTV Europe Music Awards	2023	Best Song	"Calm Down (Remix)" (featuring Selena Gomez)	Nominated	
MTV Video Music Awards	2023	Best Afrobeats	"Calm Down (Remix)" (featuring Selena Gomez)	Won	
MTV Video Music Awards	2023	Best Collaboration	"Calm Down (Remix)" (featuring Selena Gomez)	Nominated	
MTV Video Music Awards	2023	Song of the Year	"Calm Down (Remix)" (featuring Selena Gomez)	Nominated	
MTV Video Music Awards	2024	Best Afrobeats Video	"Calm Down (Remix)" (featuring Selena Gomez)	Nominated	
MTV Video Music Awards	2025	Best Afrobeats Video	Baby (Is It a Crime)	Nominated	
Odeón Awards 2022	2022	Best urban song	"44" (with Bad Gyal)	Nominated	
Net Honours	2021	Most Played Pop Song	"Woman"	Nominated	
The Headies	2019	Song of the Year	"Dumebi"	Nominated	
The Headies	2019	Viewer's Choice	Himself	Nominated	
The Headies	2019	Next Rated	Himself	Won	
The Headies	2020	Hip Hop World Revelation of the Year	Himself	Nominated	
The Headies	2020	Best Pop Single	"Lady"	Nominated	
The Headies	2023	Best Male Artist	Himself	Won	
The Headies	2023	African Artist of the Year	Himself	Won	
The Headies	2023	Digital Artist of the Year	Himself	Won	
The Headies	2023	Album of the Year	"Rave and Roses"	Nominated	
The Headies	2023	Song of the Year	"Calm Down"	Nominated	
The Headies	2025	Digital Artist of the Year	Himself	Nominated	
The Headies	2025	Best Performer(Live)	Himself	Nominated	
The Headies	2025	The Headies Award for Best Artist of the Year	Himself	Nominated	
The Headies	2025	Afrobeats Album of the Year	Heis	Won	
The Headies	2025	Album of the Year	Heis	Won	
The Headies	2025	Viewers Choice Award	"Ozeba"	Nominated	
The Headies	2025	Song of the Year	"Ozeba"	Nominated	
The Headies	2025	Producer of the Year	Himself with Producer X, CubeBeatsz,Deats, Klimperboy	Nominated	
Soundcity MVP Awards	2023	Digital Artist of the Year	Himself	Won	
Trace Awards	2023	Song of the Year	"Calm Down (Remix)" (featuring Selena Gomez)	Won	
Trace Awards	2023	Best Global African Artist	Himself	Won	
Trace Awards	2023	Best Male Artist	Himself	Nominated	
