= Charm (Rema song) =

Single by Rema

from the album Rave & Roses
- Released: 28 April 2023
- Genre: Afrobeats; Afrorave
- Length: 3:24
- Label: Mavin; Jonzing
- Songwriters: Divine Ikubor; Michael Ovie
- Producer: London

Rema singles chronology
"Holiday" (2023)	"Charm" (2023)	"Benin Boys" (2024)

Music video
- "Charm" on YouTube

"Charm" is a song by Nigerian singer Rema, from the deluxe version of his debut studio album Rave & Roses. It was released on 28 April 2023 through Jonzing World and Mavin Records. The song was written by Rema alongside London, who also serves as the song's producer.

== Background ==
On 25 April 2023, Rema shared a snippet for a new song titled "Charm" on his social media accounts, which garnered significant online attention.

== Music video ==
A music video for the song was released on 22 May 2023. The video, directed by Rema, Perliks Pictures and Folarin Oludare.

== Charts ==
Chart (2023)	Peak position
France (SNEP)	77
Nigeria (TurnTable Top 100)	1
Switzerland (Schweizer Hitparade)	80
UK Afrobeats (Official Charts)	3
US Afrobeats Songs (Billboard)	11

== Certifications ==
Certifications for "Charm"
Region	Certification	Certified units/sales
France (SNEP)	Platinum	200,000^{‡}
Nigeria (TCSN)	2× Platinum	200,000^{‡}
United Kingdom (BPI)	Silver	200,000^{‡}
^{‡} Sales+streaming figures based on certification alone.

== Release history ==
Release dates and formats for "Charm"
Region	Date	Format	Label	Ref.
Various	28 April 2023	Digital download; Streaming	Mavin Records; Jonzing World	
