= Rema Compilation =

Compilation album by Rema
- Released: 9 July 2020
- Recorded: 2019–2020
- Studio: Jonzing World Studio
- Genre: Afrobeats; trap
- Length: 32:04
- Label: Jonzing; Mavins
- Producer: D'Prince (exec.); Ozedikus; Altims; Rvssian; DeeVee; Level; The Elements

Rema chronology
| Bad Commando (2019) | Rema Compilation (2020) | Rave & Roses (2022) |

Rema Compilation is a compilation album by the Nigerian singer Rema, released on 9 July 2020, through Jonzing World, and Mavin Records. Executively produced by D'Prince, with additional production Ozedikus, Altims, Rvssian, DeeVee, Level, and The Elements. The album is a compilation of his previously released songs from Rema's Rema, Freestyle, and Bad Commando extended plays.

== Background and release ==
Rema released his compilation album titled Rema Compilation. This album brought together tracks from his earlier EPs — Rema (self-titled), Freestyle EP, and Bad Commando, offering a cohesive listening experience of his breakout work. Following the success of the compilation album, Rema announced the name of his first studio album titled Rave and Roses on 1 July 2021.

== Composition ==
The compilation album contains tracks which Ozedikus, Altims, Rvssian, DeeVee, Level, and The Elements produced.

The Ozedikus-produced track "Iron Man", the opening track on the album, is a viral hit that made it to Barack Obama's 2019 summer playlist. The second track, "Beamer (Bad Boys)", is an Afropop song produced by Rvssian. The third track, "Corny", is a smooth Afro-pop love song produced by Ozedikus. The fourth track, "Dumebi", arguably Rema's breakout song; catchy, youthful, and full of Afrobeats bounce, produced by Ozedikus. The fifth track, "Why", is a trap-infused emotional song produced by DeeVee. The sixth track, "Lady", is an Afro-fused song produced by Altims. The seventh track, "Alien", is a trap-infused emotional song produced by Level. The eighth track, "Woman", is a vibrant Afrobeats song produced by Ozedikus and Altims, celebrates femininity, beauty, and love. The Level-produced track "American Love" is a genre-blending track with global appeal. The closing track, "Ginger Me", produced by The Elements, is a vibrant Afrobeat track that delves into the intoxicating and euphoric experience of being deeply in love.

== Critical reception ==
Select rankings of Rema Compilation
| Publication | List | Rank |
|---|---|---|
| The Nation | Top 10 Nigerian albums in 2020 | 9 |
| NotJustOk | Rema's albums from worst to best (Top 7) | 5 |

== Track listing ==
Rema Compilation track listing
| No. | Title | Writer(s) | Producer(s) | Length |
|---|---|---|---|---|
| 1. | "Iron Man" | Divine Ikubor; Igbinoba Osaze | Ozedikus | 3:21 |
| 2. | "Beamer (Bad Boys)" | Ikubor; Tarik Johnston | Rvssian | 3:12 |
| 3. | "Corny" | Ikubor; Igbinoba Osaze | Ozedikus | 3:47 |
| 4. | "Dumebi" | Ikubor; Igbinoba Osaze; Elena Rose | Ozedikus | 2:59 |
| 5. | "Why" | Ikubor | DeeVee | 2:47 |
| 6. | "Lady" | Ikubor; Aluku Timothy | Altims | 3:33 |
| 7. | "Alien" | Ikubor; Level | Level | 2:42 |
| 8. | "Woman" | Ikubor; Igbinoba Osaze; Aluku Timothy | Ozedikus; Altims | 3:58 |
| 9. | "American Love" | Ikubor | Level | 2:20 |
| 10. | "Ginger Me" | kubor; Keven Wolfsohn; Paul Bogumil Goller | The Elements | 3:25 |
| Total length: | | | | 32:04 |

== Charts ==
=== Weekly charts ===
Weekly chart performance for Rema Compilation
| Chart (2025) | Peak position |
|---|---|
| Nigerian Albums (TurnTable) | 61 |

== Release history ==
Release dates and formats for Rema Compilation
| Region | Date | Format(s) | Edition(s) | Label | Ref. |
|---|---|---|---|---|---|
| Worldwide | 9 July 2020 | Digital download; streaming | Standard | Jonzing World; Mavin Records | |
| Nigeria | 9 July 2020 | Digital download; CD; streaming | Standard | Jonzing World; Mavin Records | |
| Latin America | 9 July 2020 | Digital download; streaming | Standard | Universal Music Publishing Group | |
