= Baby (Is It a Crime) =

Single by Rema
- Released: 7 February 2025
- Genre: Afrobeats; Afrobeat; Afrorave
- Length: 2:44
- Label: Mavin; Jonzing
- Songwriters: Andrew Hale; Divine Ikubor; Peace Oredope; Helen Folasade Adu; Stuart Collin Matthewman
- Producer: P.Priime

Rema singles chronology
"Fi Kan We Kan" (2024)	"Baby (Is It a Crime)" (2025)	"Bout U" (2025)

Music video
- "Baby (Is It a Crime)" on YouTube

"Baby (Is It a Crime)" is a song by Nigerian singer and rapper Rema. It was released as a single through Mavin Records and Jonzing World on 7 February 2025. The song was written by Rema alongside Stuart Matthewman, Sade Adu, P.Priime, and Andrew Hale, while production was handled by P.Priime. As of February 2025, the song is the most streamed Nigerian song to be released in 2025, on Spotify.

== Background and release ==
The song's creation began in 2024, following the release of Rema's second studio album, Heis. Rema first teased the song in November 2024. On 4 February 2025, two days after the 67th Annual Grammy Awards, Rema announced the song's release date on his Twitter account. The song was officially released on 7 February 2025.

== Composition ==
"Baby (Is It a Crime)" was written by Divine Ikubor, Andrew Hale, Helen Folasade Adu, and Stuart Collin Matthewman, and produced by P. Priime. The song samples "Is It a Crime?" by Sade, from their 1985 album Promise. Rema delivers the lyrics of "Baby (Is It a Crime)" in harsh and cool tones, initiating the narrative by confessing his love for a girl he has apparently just met.

== Critical reception ==
Rolling Stone named the song one of the standout tracks of 2025 so far, praising its cool and nonchalant vibe, which contrasts with the more intense tone of the album. Fans had been eagerly awaiting the Sade-sampling song since Rema teased a snippet last November. The full version showcases Rema at his sensual best. "I just had the biggest debut in my career," he told Rolling Stone on the day of its release, with the song earning nearly 3 million streams in its first 24 hours.

Aaron Williams of Uproxx praised Rema for incorporating Sade Adu's vocals into "Baby (Is It a Crime)" alongside a pulsating Afrobeat rhythm, resulting in a track that balances nostalgia with a fresh sound.

=== Accolades ===
Year	Awards ceremony	Award description(s)	Results	Ref
2026	The Headies	Best Recording of the Year	Pending	
2026	The Headies	Viewer's Choice	Pending	
2026	The Headies	Producer of the Year (P.Priime for "Baby (Is It a Crime)", "MMS" and "Billionaires Club")	Pending	

== Charts ==
Chart performance for "Baby (Is It a Crime)"
Chart (2025)	Peak position
Canada Hot 100 (Billboard)	98
France (SNEP)	194
Global 200 (Billboard)	192
Global Excl. US (Billboard)	148
Honduras Anglo Airplay (Monitor Latino)	2
Jamaica Airplay (JAMMS)	7
New Zealand Hot Singles (RMNZ)	23
Nigeria (TurnTable Top 100)	1
UK Singles (Official Charts)	53
UK Afrobeats (Official Charts)	1
UK Hip Hop/R&B (Official Charts)	17
US Afrobeats Songs (Billboard)	3
US World Digital Song Sales (Billboard)	4

== Certifications ==
Certifications for "Baby (Is It a Crime)"
Region	Certification	Certified units/sales
Nigeria (TCSN)	2× Platinum	200,000^{‡}
South Africa (RISA)	Gold	20,000^{‡}
^{‡} Sales+streaming figures based on certification alone.

== Release history ==
Release dates and formats for "Baby (Is It a Crime)"
Region	Date	Format	Label	Ref.
Various	7 February 2025	Digital download; streaming	Jonzing; Mavin	
Italy	14 February 2025	Radio airplay	Universal	

== See also ==
- List of number-one songs of 2025 (Nigeria)
