= Piña colada (disambiguation) =

Piña colada is a type of cocktail drink.

Piña colada may also refer to:

- "Piña Colada Boy", a 2008 song by Baby Alice
- "Escape (the Piña Colada Song)", a 1979 song by Rupert Holmes
- "Piña Colada Shot", 2017 song by A.B. Quintanilla
- "Piña Colada", 1978 song by Eumir Deodato
- "Pinacolada", a song by Thisizlondon, Ayra Starr, 6lack
