= The Headies Award for Viewer's Choice =

Nigerian music industry award

- Awarded for: Most digital tractions (downloads, views, streams) in the year under review
- Country: Nigeria
- Presented by: Hip Hop World Magazine
- First award: 2018
- Website: theheadies.com

The Headies Award for Viewer's Choice is an award presented at The Headies, a ceremony that was established in 2006 and originally called the Hip Hop World Awards. It was first presented to Wizkid in 2018.

== Recipients ==
Viewer's Choice
Year	Nominees	Result
2024	Chike & MohBad – "Egwu"	Won
2024	Young Jonn – "Big Big Things" (featuring Kizz Daniel and Seyi Vibez)	Nominated
2024	Hyce, BoyPee, & Brown Joel – "Ogechi (Remix)" (featuring Davido)	Nominated
2024	Kizz Daniel – "Showa"	Nominated
2024	Seyi Vibez – "Different Pattern"	Nominated
2024	Rema – "Ozeba"	Nominated
2024	Tems – "Love Me JeJe"	Nominated
2024	Shallipopi – "Cast" (featuring Odumodublvck)	Nominated
2024	Ayo Maff – "Dealer" (featuring Fireboy DML)	Nominated
2024	Flavour – "Big Baller"	Nominated
2023	Victony & Tempoe – "Soweto"	Won
2023	Ruger – "Asiwaju"	Nominated
2023	Fireboy DML & Asake – "Bandana"	Nominated
2023	Ayra Starr – "Rush"	Nominated
2023	Asake – "Terminator"	Nominated
2023	Mavins – "Overloading"	Nominated
2023	Crayon – "Ijo (Laba Laba)"	Nominated
2023	Oxlade – "Ku Lo Sa"	Nominated
2023	Kizz Daniel & Tekno – "Buga (song)"	Nominated
2023	Pheelz & Davido – "Electricity"	Nominated
2022	Ayra Starr – "Bloody Samaritan"	Won
2022	Fireboy DML – "Peru"	Nominated
2022	Joeboy – "Sip"	Nominated
2022	Lojay & Sarz – "Monalisa"	Nominated
2022	Nektunez & Goya Menor – "Ameno Amapiano"	Nominated
2022	Olamide – "Infinity" (featuring Omah Lay)	Nominated
2022	Rema – "Soundgasm"	Nominated
2022	Wizkid – "Essence" (featuring Tems)	Nominated
2020	Wizkid	Won
2020	Davido	Nominated
2020	Omah Lay	Nominated
2020	Burna Boy	Nominated
2020	Falz	Nominated
2020	Fireboy DML	Nominated
2020	Mayorkun	Nominated
2020	DJ Neptune	Nominated
2019	Teni	Won
2019	Mr Eazi	Nominated
2019	Fireboy DML	Nominated
2019	Joeboy	Nominated
2019	Rema	Nominated
2019	Burna Boy	Nominated
2019	Wizkid	Nominated
2019	Davido	Nominated
2018	Wizkid – "Come Closer" (featuring Drake)	Won
2018	Davido – "If"	Nominated
2018	Olamide – "Wo"	Nominated
2018	Runtown – "Mad Over You"	Nominated
2018	Kizz Daniel – "Yeba"	Nominated
2018	Tekno – "Yawa"	Nominated

== Category records ==
Most wins

Rank	1st
Artist	Wizkid; Teni
Total wins	1 win

Most nominations

Rank	1st
Artist	Wizkid; Davido
Total noms	2 nominations
