= Ravage (EP) =

EP by Rema
- Released: October 27, 2023
- Genre: Afrobeats; Afropop; Nigerian alté
- Length: 14:36
- Label: Jonzing; Mavin
- Producer: London; Blaisebeatz; P.Priime

Rema chronology
Rave & Roses (2022)	Ravage (2023)	Heis (2024)

Ravage is the fourth extended play by Nigerian rapper, singer, and songwriter Rema released on October 27, 2023, through Jonzing World, and Mavin Records. Like his previous project, Rave & Roses (2022), the EP blends various genres, including alté, afrobeats, and afropop. Lyrically, it explores themes of hard work, pride, and diligence.

== Background and release ==
Following the success of his debut studio album Rave & Roses (2022), Rema announced the EP on October 24, 2023, teasing singles "DND" and "Smooth Criminal". Three days later, the EP was released, featuring these singles. In November, Rema dropped the music video for "Trouble Maker", directed by Meji Alabi.

== Music and lyrics ==
Ravage is a five-track set that explores themes of anger, pride, heartbreak, and empowerment through rage lyrics. It features Afrobeats with elements of alté and incorporates Afropop percussive rhythms. The tracks include:

"Trouble Maker", an Afropop song where Rema sends a message to his fans, clarifying that he's not a troublemaker and doesn't disturb anyone. "DND" (Do Not Disturb), an Afrobeats song describing how others perceive him and addressing hate and fake love. "Smooth Criminal", an Afrobeats song discussing modern-day teenage peer pressure and experiences. "Don't Leave", an Afrobeats song expressing romantic love and sex. "Red Portion", an Afrobeats song about love and iniquity.

== Critical reception ==
Professional ratings
Review scores
Source	Rating
Pulse Nigeria	9/10

In a review for Pulse Nigeria, Adeayo Adebiyi noted that the EP is marked by an "exhale of fire", with Rema making it clear that his humility shouldn't be mistaken for cowardice. Moreover, Adebiyi praised Rema's exceptional ability to craft a unique niche, and his effortless skill in switching up his style whenever he wants to, which is even more impressive.

== Track listing ==
All tracks are written by Divine Ikubor.

Ravage track listing
No.	Title	Producer(s)	Length
1.	"Trouble Maker"	Blaisebeatz	2:36
2.	"DND"	P.Priime	2:46
3.	"Smooth Criminal"	P.Priime	3:16
4.	"Don't Leave"	London; P.Priime	3:06
5.	"Red Portion"	London	2:54
Total length:			14:36

== Charts ==
Chart performance for Ravage
Chart (2023)	Peak position
Nigerian Albums (TurnTable)	1

== Release history ==
Region	Date	Format	Version	Label
Various	27 October 2023	Streaming, digital download, CD	Standard	Jonzing World, Mavin, Virgin Music
