= Benin Boys =

2024 single by Rema and Shallipopi

Single by Rema and Shallipopi

from the album Heis
- Released: 20 June 2024
- Recorded: 2024
- Genre: Afrobeats; amapiano
- Length: 2:50
- Label: Mavin; Virgin; WCM
- Songwriters: Divine Ikubor; Agada Prince Oyada; Crown Uzama
- Producers: Rema; Producer X

Rema singles chronology
"Pretty Girl" (2023)	"Benin Boys" (2024)	"Hehehe" (2024)

Shallipopi singles chronology
"Trees" (2024)	"Benin Boys" (2024)	"Eye Service" (2024)

Music video
- "Benin Boys" on YouTube

Lyrical video
- "Benin Boys" on YouTube

"Benin Boys" (stylized in all caps) is a song by Nigerian singer and rapper Rema featuring fellow Nigerian singer and rapper Shallipopi. Released on 20 June 2024, as the lead single from Rema's second studio album Heis. It features a prominent Afrobeats rhythm. The music video was released the next day.

== Background ==
Following the song's release, Rema and Shallipopi shared a studio clip on social media on 30 January 2024. Produced by X and co-produced by Rema, the track is a musical celebration of Benin City culture. In an interview, Rema revealed his aim: to craft a song that showcases his cultural pride while connecting with his audience on a deeper level, fostering community and shared identity among listeners.

== Composition ==
The song features a prominent afrobeats rhythm, accompanied by a range of percussion instruments, a driving bassline, and keyboard synths. The chord progression is centered around C minor and G7, creating a harmonic foundation that supports the song's energetic and celebratory feel. Lyrically, the song is an ode to pride and wealth, with Rema and Shallipopi delivering verses that celebrate their cultural heritage and affluence. The lyrics are written in a style that is both boastful and aspirational, with the artists expressing their pride in their roots and their achievements. The song's themes of pride, wealth, and cultural celebration are woven throughout the lyrics, creating a narrative that is both personal and universal.

== Critical reception ==
Oumou Fofana, a music critic for BET, described the song as "a dynamic exchange of verses over heavy drums and electrifying background strings, showcasing Rema and Shallipopi's lyrical prowess and musical chemistry." Fofana's assessment highlights the track's energetic and infectious beat, which combines traditional drum patterns with modern string arrangements, creating a unique sound that blends cultural heritage with contemporary style.

== Music video ==
A music video for the song was released on 21 June 2024. The video, directed by Director K, features the two artists in distinct settings, with Rema perched on an airplane flap and Shallipopi posing alongside a car. The visuals also incorporate elements of Benin culture, including the prominent display of the Benin Ancestral Bronzes. Additionally, the video features imagery of bats, which symbolize the Benin symbol.

== Credits and personnel ==
- Divine Ikubor – songwriting, composition
- Crown Uzama – songwriting, composition
- Agada Prince Oyada – songwriting, composition, production
- Divine Ikubor – co-production
- George Momoh – mastering

== Charts ==
Chart (2024)	Peak position
Nigeria (TurnTable Top 100)	1
Top 50 Streaming Songs (TurnTable)	27
TCL Radio (TheCable)	1
US Afrobeats Songs (Billboard)	13
UK Afrobeats (Official Charts)	5

== Certifications ==
Certifications for "Benin Boys"
Region	Certification	Certified units/sales
Nigeria (TCSN)	2× Platinum	200,000^{‡}
^{‡} Sales+streaming figures based on certification alone.

== Release history ==
Region	Date	Format	Label	Ref.
Various	20 June 2024	Digital download; streaming	Jonzing, Mavin	
