= Bad Commando =

EP by Rema
- Released: 4 October 2019
- Recorded: 2019
- Studio: Jonzing World Studio
- Genre: Afrobeats; Afro-pop; Trap
- Length: 10:09
- Label: Jonzing; Mavins
- Producer: D'Prince (exec.); Honter; Altims; Kill September; OVÖ; 1Mind

Rema chronology
Freestyle (2019)	Bad Commando (2019)	Rema Compilation (2020)

Bad Commando is the third extended play by Nigerian singer Rema. It was released on 4 October 2019 through Jonzing World, and Mavin Records. Executively produced by D'Prince, with additional production from Honter, Altims, Kill September, OVÖ, and 1Mind. Shortly after the EP was released, it debuted at Number 1 on Apple Music Top 100 in Nigeria.

== Background and release ==
Following the success of his second extended play Rema Freestyle, Rema released Bad Commando.

On 4 October 2019, Pitchfork named the lead track from the EP "Bad Commando", as the must-hear rap song of the day.

=== Promotion ===
The accompanying music video for the album "Bad Commando", was directed by Seun Opabisi and Kewa Oni.

== Composition ==
The EP contains four tracks which were produced by London (fka. Honter), Altims, Kill September, OVÖ, and 1Mind.

The London-produced track "Bad Commando", the opening track on the EP contains lyrics recorded in Nigerian Pidgin. The second track, "Lady", is an Afropop song produced by Altims. The OVÖ, 1Mind, and Kill September-produced track "Rewind" contains elements of Caribbean dancehall. The closing track, "Spaceship Jocelyn", is an emo trap song.

== Critical reception ==
Professional ratings
Review scores
Source	Rating
Pulse Nigeria	4.7/10

A review from Pulse Nigeria, Motolani Alake said, “This EP is very – maybe too – experimental. It’s understandable why it had to be experimental, but it’s an average EP. By Rema’s lofty standards over the past two EPs, Bad Commando is a weak project.”

== Track listing ==
Bad Commando track listing
No.	Title	Writer(s)	Producer(s)	Length
1.	"Bad Commando"	Divine Ikubor; Michael Hunter	London (fka. Honter)	1:45
2.	"Lady"	Ikubor; Timothy Aluku	Altims	3:33
3.	"Rewind"	Ikubor; Mac Sutphin; Oliver El-Khatib; Sebastian Lopez	OVÖ; 1Mind; Kill September	2:32
4.	"Spaceship Jocelyn"	kubor; Timothy Aluku	Altims	3:19
Total length:				10:09

== Release history ==
Region	Date	Format	Version	Label
Various	4 October 2019	streaming, digital download	Standard	Jonzing World, Mavin
