= Pinacolada (song) =

Single by Thisizlondon, Ayra Starr, 6LACK
- Released: 15 August 2024
- Genre: Afropop
- Length: 2:04
- Label: Rogue Collective; LVRN
- Songwriters: Michael Hunter, Oyinkansola Aderibigbe, Ricardo Valentine, Yinka Bankole
- Producers: Thisizlondon; Fwdslxsh; AoD

Thisizlondon singles chronology
"Pinacolada" (2024)	"Si mañana me muero" (2025)

"Pinacolada" is a song by Nigerian record producer Thisizlondon, released on 15 August 2024 through Rogue Collective, under exclusive license to Love Renaissance. The single features guest appearances from Ayra Starr, and 6lack. "Pinacolada" was produced by Thisizlondon, Fwdslxsh, and AoD for Rogue Collective and LVRN. The song debuted at number 15 on Nigeria's Official Nigeria Top 100 on 26 August 2024, and debuted at number 16 on Billboard U.S. Afrobeats Songs for the week of 31 August 2024.

== Background ==
A month after the release of "Pinacolada", LVRN CEO and co-founder Tunde Balogun, spoke with Billboard, on the signing of London (now. Thisizlondon) and his forthcoming project to be released through LVRN. “We’re excited to welcome ThisizLondon to the family. He’s one of the most talented producers to emerge from the continent, and I’ve been a fan for a while,” he added “My team and I are eager to support him on his musical journey.” Before the single's release, London signed an exclusive publishing deal with LVRN.

== Commercial performance ==
On 25 August 2024, "Pinacolada" debuted at number 10 on the UK Official Afrobeats Chart. On 26 August 2024, it peaked at number 5 on Nigeria radio, number 15 on Nigeria's Official Nigeria Top 100 songs, and number 12 on Nigeria's Top Afro-Pop Songs. On 31 August 2024, it debuted at number 16 on Billboard U.S. Afrobeats Songs.

=== Rankings ===
Select rankings of PINACOLADA
Publication	List	Rank	Ref.
Billboard	Billboard 's Afrobeats Fresh Picks of August 2024	5	

== Charts ==
Chart performance for "PINACOLADA"
Chart (2024)	Peak position
NG Official Top 100 (TurnTable)	15
NG Top Afro-POP Songs (TurnTable)	12
NG Official Radio Songs (TurnTable)	5
US Afrobeats (Billboard)	16
UK Afrobeats (Official Charts)	10

== Release history ==
Release history for "PINACOLADA"
Region	Date	Format	Label	Ref.
Various	15 August 2024	Digital download; streaming	Rogue Collective; LVRN	
