= Soundgasm =

Single by Rema

from the album Rave & Roses
- Released: June 11, 2021
- Genre: Afrobeats; Afrorave
- Length: 3:25
- Label: Mavin Records; Jonzing
- Songwriters: Ikubor Divine; Michael Ovie
- Producers: London; Santi; Dro

Rema singles chronology
"Bounce" (2021)	"Soundgasm" (2021)	"Calm Down" (2022)

Music video
- "Soundgasm" on YouTube

"Soundgasm" is a 2021 song by Nigerian singer Rema. It was released as the first single from his debut studio album Rave & Roses. It was released on 11 June 2021 through Jonzing World and Mavin. The song was written by Rema alongside London, who also serves as the song's co-producer.

== Music video ==
The music video for the song was released on June 11, 2021, and was directed by Bobby Hanaford.

== Charts ==
Chart (2021–2022)	Peak position
France (SNEP)	179
Netherlands (Single Top 100)	60
Nigeria (TurnTable Top 100)	3
US Billboard Afrobeats Songs (Billboard)	15
UK Afrobeats (Official Charts)	3

== Certification ==
Certifications for "Soundgasm"
Region	Certification	Certified units/sales
France (SNEP)	Platinum	200,000^{‡}
Netherlands (NVPI)	Gold	46,500^{‡}
Nigeria (TCSN)	Gold	50,000^{‡}
Switzerland (IFPI Switzerland)	Gold	10,000^{‡}
United Kingdom (BPI)	Silver	200,000^{‡}
^{‡} Sales+streaming figures based on certification alone.

== Release history ==
Release dates and formats for "Soundgasm"
Region	Date	Format	Label	Ref.
Various	11 June 2021	Digital download; Streaming	Mavin Records; Jonzing World	
