= Afro Nation =

Music festival

- Status: Active
- Genre: Afrobeats, Amapiano, RnB, Hip hop, Dancehall, Gqom, Afroswing
- Dates: July
- Frequency: Annually
- Venue: Praia da Rocha
- Location: Portimão
- Country: Portugal
- Years active: 2019–present
- Organiser: The Malachite Group; Live Nation; Memories of Tomorrow
- Member: The Malachite Group
- Website: afronation.comi

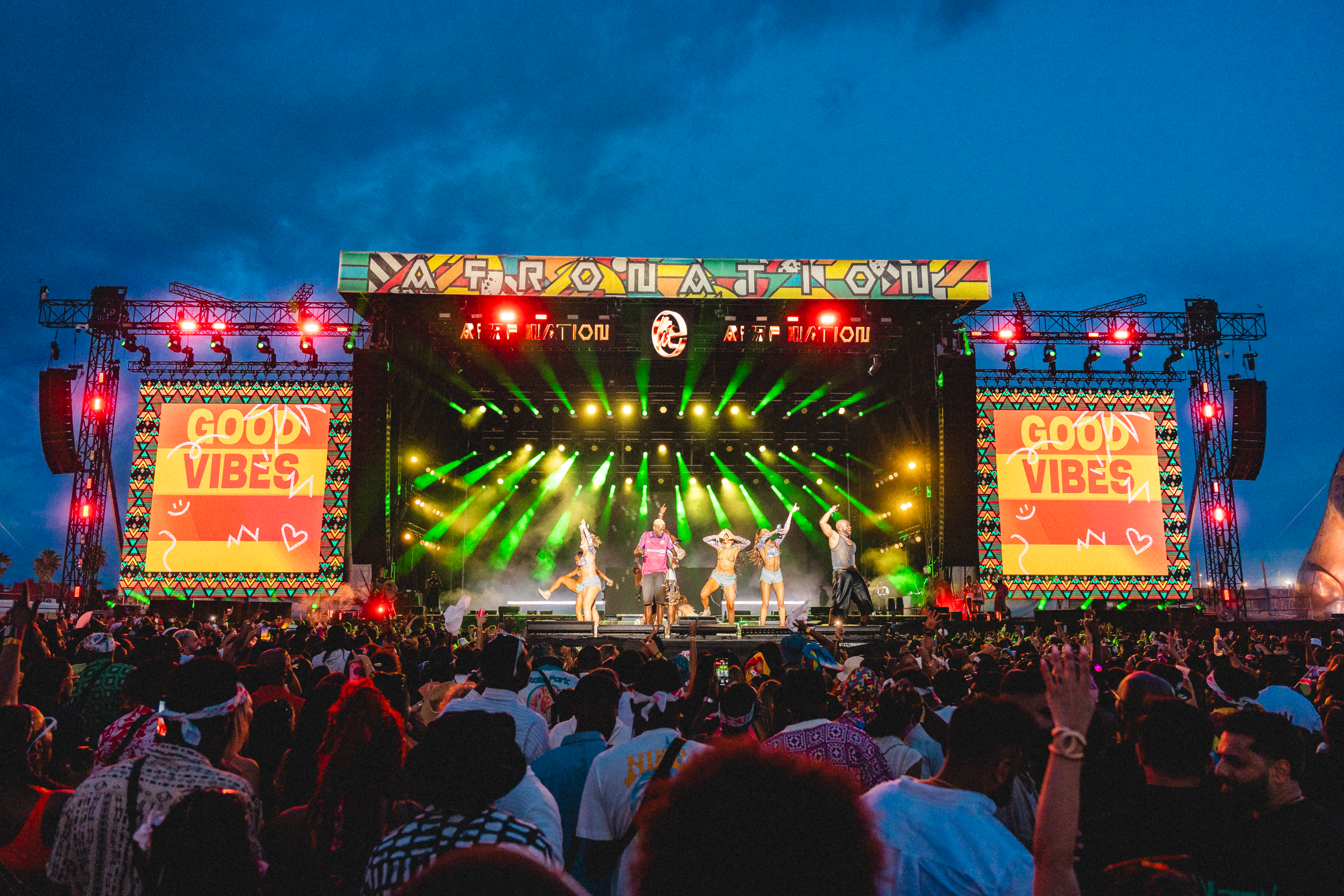
Afro Nation Portugal LIT Stage 2024

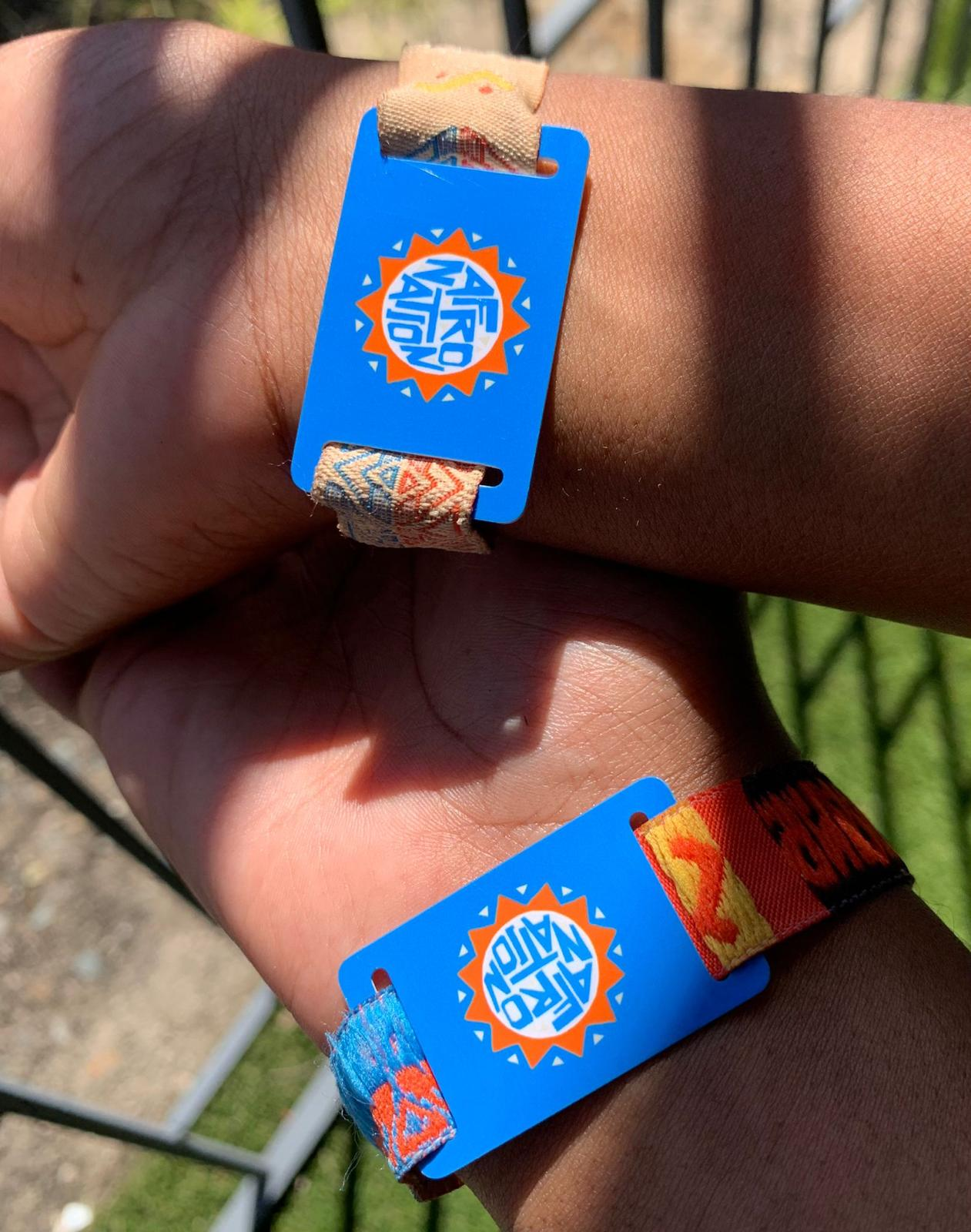
Afro Nation tickets

Afro Nation is an annual three-day music festival organised by global entertainment company The Malachite Group (TMG), founded in 2019 to unite the African diaspora in a celebration of dance, food, fashion, music. The festival focuses on showcasing African and international artists across genres such as Afrobeats, Amapiano, RnB, Hip hop, Dancehall, and more. As well as the annual Portugal edition, Afro Nation has also since taken place in Ghana, Puerto Rico, Miami and Detroit.

Afro Nation as a festival and global cultural movement has evolved into a platform designed to amplify the voices of African artists worldwide. With past headliners like Burna Boy, Wizkid, Davido, Megan Thee Stallion, 50 Cent, Chris Brown and Nicki Minaj, the festival has been bridging African music with the global stage.

Since 2019 the flagship Portugal festival has doubled in size, attracting 40,000 people from 140 countries worldwide, with 90% of festival goers travelling to the event from abroad.

The festival was nominated in the Best Overseas Festival category at the 2019 UK Festival Awards. In 2020, Billboard Magazine named Afro Nation as one of The Gatekeepers of the Nigerian music industry.

== History ==
On 1 August 2019, Afro Nation (also marketed as Afro Nation Portugal) was established as a four-day annual music festival in Portimão, Portugal. Billed as the first festival to celebrate the African Diaspora, the event drew approximately 20,000 attendees daily and featured live music from Nigeria, Ghana, Tanzania, Jamaica, the UK and the US. It was created to promote African music genres and provide a platform for artists across the diaspora.

On 13 December 2019, Afro Nation released its compilation mixtape curated by MOVES Recordings, titled Afro Nation, Vol. 1. The album features guest appearance from SMADE, Ice Prince, Slim Kofi, Lighter Tod, Joey B, Kuami Eugene, Medikal, Eddie Kadi, Bisa Kdei, Adekunle Gold, Oxlade, Reekado Banks, Eugy, Br3nya, and Terry Apala.

In 2020, the planned second editions of both Afro Nation Portugal and Afro Nation Ghana were postponed to 1 July 2022, and 29 December 2022, due to COVID-19.

On 26 September 2021, Afro Nation and Official Charts Company founded the official weekly UK Afrobeats Chart Show on BBC Radio 1Xtra, with host Eddie Kadi.

Expansion and Developments (2022–2024)

In 2022 Afro Nation Portugal introduced a new main stage, which was also transported to Accra for Afro Nation Ghana. The 2022 Portugal edition also saw the introduction of a second stage named Piano People, dedicated to Amapiano, reflecting the increasing prominence of the South African electronic music genre globally.

In 2022 the Piano People brand expanded to standalone events in the UK, taking place at a variety of venues such as Ministry of Sound, Printworks and also launched the first Amapiano stage at the Notting Hill Carnival.

Afro Nation Portugal 2023’s attendance figures were reported to have doubled since 2019, now attracting 40,000 people from 140 countries worldwide. That year the festival had a direct impact of €114 million to the local economy. On 10 March 2024 the festival released a short film documentary titled ‘Afro Nation: A Movement’ shot during the 2023 edition of the Portugal festival, and in October 2024 the film was shown during Amsterdam Dance Event.

In November 2023 Piano People hosted its largest Amapiano event at London's 15,000 capacity club Drumsheds, before launching one-day open-air festivals at New York's Central Park on 27 July 2024 and London’s Southwark Park on 23 August 2024.

Afro Nation Portugal 2024 was headlined by Nigerian artist Asake, who brought out UK rapper Central Cee as a surprise guest for their debut live performance of the track ‘Wave’. The 2024 edition of Afro Nation Portugal was sponsored by brands including Hennessy, Havana Club, Jägermeister and Converse.Performances from the Piano People stage were streamed by Beatport, and DBN Gogo's live set from Afro Nation featured in DJ Mag's Top Mixes of 2024.

Fifth Anniversary (2025)

Afro Nation Portugal is set to return for its fifth edition on 9 July 2025, with Burna Boy, Tems, Amaarae, Uncle Waffles, DBN Gogo and more announced to perform over three days on Praia da Rocha beach.

== Portugal's audience and headliners ==
Despite its export to other countries, Afro Nation main venue keeps on being at Portugal. Both audience and highly safe environment have maintained Portugal's summer festival as Afro Nation main venue in terms of investment associated with increasing growth of audience and line up quality as festival records shows.

=== Afro Nation Portugal 2019 (August 01–04) ===
- Audience: ≈ 20,000 people every day
- Line up: Burna Boy, Davido, Wizkid, Tiwa Savage and J Hus.

=== Afro Nation Portugal 2022 (July 01–03) ===
- Audience: ≈ 35,000 people every day
- Line up: Burna Boy, Davido, Wizkid, Chris Brown, Megan Thee Stallion, P-Square, Focalistic, Kabza De Small, Major League DJz and DJ Maphorisa.

=== Afro Nation Portugal 2023 (June 28–30) ===
- Audience: ≈ 40,000 people every day
- Line up: Burna Boy, Davido, Wizkid, 50 Cent, Booba, Little Simz, Scorpion Kings, Major League DJz and Uncle Waffles.

=== Afro Nation Portugal 2024 (June 26–28) ===
- Audience: ≈ 40,000 people every day
- Line up: Nicki Minaj, Rema, Asake, Fally Ipupa, Dadju & Tayc, Major League DJz, Uncle Waffles and Musa Keys.

=== Afro Nation Portugal 2025 (July 09–11) ===
- Audience: ≈ 40,000 people every day
- Line up: Burna Boy, Davido, Tems, Mary J. Blige, Booba & Amaarae, Dexta Daps, Franglish, Gabzy, Uncle Waffles, Scorpion Kings, DBN Gogo, Naza, Odeal, Tiakola, June Freedom.

=== Afro Nation Portugal 2026 (July 03–05) ===
- Audience: ≈ 40,000 people every day
- Line up: Asake, Tyla, Wizkid, Gunna, Kehlani, Mariah The Scientist, Ludmilla, Niska and Olamide.

== US and Africa events ==
=== Afro Nation Ghana 2019 (December 27–30) ===
- Venue: Laboma Beach
- Headliners: Alkaline, Burna Boy, Shatta Wale, Wizkid, Davido and Stonebwoy.

=== Afro Nation Puerto Rico 2022 (March 24–26) ===
- Venue: Carolina Public Beach
- Headliners: Wizkid, Megan Thee Stallion and Rick Ross.

=== Afro Nation Ghana 2022 (December 29–30) ===
- Venue: Carolina Public Beach
- Headliners: Meek Mill, Stonebwoy, Tiwa Savage and P-Square.

=== Afro Nation Miami 2023 (May 27–28) ===
- Venue: LoanDepot park
- Headliners: Burna Boy, Wizkid, Rema, Asake, Shenseea and Uncle Waffles.

=== Afro Nation Detroit 2023 (August 19–20) ===
- Venue: Bedrock's Douglass Site
- Headliners: Burna Boy, Davido, Ari Lennox, P-Square, Coi Leray and Latto.

=== Afro Nation Detroit 2024 (August 17–18) ===
- Venue: Bedrock's Douglass Site
- Headliners: Rema, Asake, PartyNextDoor, Scorpion Kings and Uncle Waffles.

=== Afro Nation Punta Cana 2025 (November 7–9) ===
- Venue: Pearl Beach Club and El Dorado Waterpark
- Headliners: Sexyy Red, Olamide, Shallipopi, Odeal, Ruger, TXC.

=== Afro Nation Presents: WAV. Festival 2026 (January 02) ===
- Venue: Green Point Track, Cape Town
- Headliners: Mariah The Scientist, Sasha Keable, Wale, Isaiah Falls, Kelvin Momo.

=== Performers ===
Emerging and established acts from genres like Afrobeats, Amapiano, and Dancehall are consistently part of its lineup. Since 2019, the festival has featured performances from Burna Boy, Wizkid, Davido, Rema, Asake, Tyla, Nicki Minaj, Chris Brown, 50 Cent, Megan Thee Stallion, Central Cee, Little Simz, Meek Mill, Rick Ross, Ari Lennox, PartyNextDoor, Shenseea, Coi Leray, Latto, Aya Nakamura, Booba, Alkaline, Koffee, Beenie Man, Popcaan, Ayra Starr, Fireboy DML, Omah Lay, Major League DJz, Scorpion Kings, Uncle Waffles, DBN Gogo, Focalistic, Musa Keys, Fally Ipupa, Ninho, Dadju & Tayc, Franglish, Busy Signal, Femi Kuti, Adekunle Gold, Afro B, B Young, Distruction Boyz, Hardy Caprio, King Promise, Maleek Berry, Mist, Mostack, Ms Dynamite, Not3s, NSG, Octavian, Stefflon Don, Teni, The Compozers, Vanessa Mdee, Laycon, Yxng Bane, C4 Pedro, CKay, Dadju, Diamond Platnumz, Ding Dong, Innoss'B, KiDi, Kizz Daniel, Kuami Eugene, Black Sherif, Tiwa Savage, Gyakie, Maître Gims, Naira Marley, Nelson Freitas, Niniola, Patoranking, R2Bees, Reekado Banks, Ruger, Small Doctor, Sona, Tekno, Wande Coal and more.

== Radio shows ==
=== Official UK Afrobeats Chart Show ===
On 26 September 2021, Afro Nation and Official Charts Company founded the official weekly UK Afrobeats Chart Show on BBC Radio 1 Xtra, with host Eddie Kadi.

== Music charts ==
- U.S Afrobeats Songs Chart - (An Afrobeats chart founded by Billboard and Afro Nation, in 2022)
- UK Afrobeats Singles Chart - (An Afrobeats chart founded by Official Charts Company and Afro Nation, in 2020)

== Discography ==
=== Mixtapes ===
List of mixtapes with selected details
Title	EP details
Afro Nation, Vol. 1	Released: 13 December 2019; Label: MOVES Recordings; Formats: Digital download, streaming

== Challenges ==
In 2020, Afro Nation Portugal was set to begin operating as a three-day annual event. However, the second edition was postponed to 1 July 2022, due to the outbreak of COVID-19. The festival faced backlash from customers after initially not issuing refunds and instead having to retain tickets for the postponed event. In December 2020, the Ghanaian edition of the festival was also cancelled due to the COVID-19 outbreak.

In 2022, the festival in Puerto Rico was shadowed with the cancellation of Burna Boy, Tems, Koffee and Beenie Man in the leadup to the festival. The same year, the festival was stopped in Ghana during the course of its second day, due to safety concerns. On 9 June 2023, the organisers of the festival announced Afro Nation Nigeria, a new series of the festival to be held in Lagos. On 31 October 2023, the Nigerian edition of the festival was cancelled.

== Cultural impact ==
Since 2019, Afro Nation has been promoting African music and artists and changing the narrative around Africa, whilst promoting unity, inclusivity and environmental sustainability.
