= Ozeba =

Song by Rema

from the album Heis
- Released: 10 July 2024
- Recorded: 2024
- Genre: Afrorave
- Length: 2:17
- Label: Virgin; Mavin; WCM
- Songwriters: Divine Ikubor; Michael Ovie Hunter
- Producers: Rema; London

"Ozeba" (stylized in all caps) is a song by Nigerian singer and rapper Rema. Released on 10 July 2024, as the seventh track from Rema's second studio album Heis.

== Lyrics and composition ==
Rema's "Ozeba" features lyrics about his party lifestyle, romantic conquests, and unapologetic bad boy image. He asserts his toughness, confidence, and unyielding approach, embracing his reputation for trouble - a notion reflected in the Benin term "Ozeba". Rema also refers to himself as H.I.M. (His Imperial Majesty).

== Personnel ==
Credits adapted from Tidal.

- Rema – producer
- London – producer
- Michael Ovie Hunter – writer
- Divine Ikubor – writer

== Charts ==
| Chart (2024) | Peak position |
|---|---|
| Top 100 Nigeria (TurnTable) | 3 |
| US Billboard Afrobeats Songs (Billboard) | 16 |
| UK Afrobeats (Official Charts) | 5 |
| Top 100 Nigeria (Boomplay) | 4 |

== Certifications ==
Certifications for "Ozeba"
| Region | Certification | Certified units/sales |
|---|---|---|
| Nigeria (TCSN) | Platinum | 100,000^{‡} |
^{‡} Sales+streaming figures based on certification alone.
