= Rema (EP) =

EP by Rema
- Released: 22 March 2019
- Recorded: 2019
- Genres: Afrobeats; Afropop; Trap
- Length: 12:56
- Labels: Jonzing; Mavin Records
- Producers: D'Prince (exec.); Ozedikus

Rema chronology
Rema (2019)	Freestyle (2019)

Singles from Rema
- 1. "Dumebi" Released: 24 March 2019

Rema is the eponymous debut extended play by Nigerian singer, rapper and songwriter Rema. It was released on 22 March 2019 by Jonzing World, and Mavin Records.

== Background and release ==
In 2018, Rema posted a viral freestyle on Instagram to D'Prince's track "Gucci Gang". The post caught the attention of D'Prince who flew him to Lagos to offer a record deal. Rema signed a record deal with D'Prince's Jonzing World, a subsidiary of Mavin Records, in 2019. After the deal Rema released the 4-track eponymous Ep through Jonzing World on 22 March 2019.

On 21 May 2019, Jonzing World and Mavin's released the music video of the lead single "Dumebi" which was directed by Ademola Falomo and features a cameo appearance from Nigerian model Diana Eneje.

== Composition ==
The EP contains four tracks which was produced by Ozedikus.

"Iron Man" the first track is an Afrorave ballad with bollywood tunes about Rema's strength to protect his love interest. The second track, "Why", is a trap song which shows rema rapping and passing messages of heartbreak through the lyrics. The next track, "Dumebi", is a Afropop dance party song about his search for love and his view of his view of her attractive body. While the last track "Corny" is a pop song addressed to a love interest about his affirmation of love.

== Critical reception ==
Professional ratings
Review scores
Source	Rating
Pulse Nigeria	3/5 stars

A review from Pulse Nigeria said the EP "excels on cohesion, a tracklist that enabled transcendence and segues, good production" but also criticized the initial meaning of the lyrics.

== Track listing ==
Rema track listing
No.	Title	Writer(s)	Producer(s)	Length
1.	"Iron Man"	Divine Ikubor; Osazee Festus Igbinoba	Ozedikus	3:21
2.	"Why"	Divine Ikubor; Austin Divine	0zedikus	2:47
3.	"Dumebi"	Divine Ikubor; Osazee Festus Igbinoba	Ozedikus	2:59
4.	"Corny"	Divine Ikubor; Osazee Festus Igbinoba	Ozedikus	3:41
Total length:				12:57

== Release history ==
Region	Date	Format	Version	Label
Various	22 March 2019	streaming, digital download, CD	Standard	Jonzing World, Mavin
