= Dumebi =

2019 debut single by Rema

Single by Rema

from the EP Rema
- Released: March 24, 2019
- Genre: Afrobeat; afroswing; afrobeats
- Length: 2:59
- Label: Jonzing; Mavin
- Songwriters: Divine Ikubor; Andrea Elena; Igbinoba Osazee
- Producer: Ozedikus

Rema singles chronology
"Iron Man" (2019)	"Dumebi" (2019)	"Ginger Me" (2020)

Music video
- "Dumebi" on YouTube

"Dumebi" is the debut single by Nigerian singer and rapper Rema. Produced by Ozedikus, the song became a sleeper hit. Its success spawned five remixes, including a version featuring American singer Becky G on February 13, 2020, and four additional remixes on March 22, 2020.

== Background ==
Rema wrote the song in 2019 while working with Ozedikus in the studio. The song was his major breakout hit. Its popularity soared when it was featured on Barack Obama's summer playlist.

== Composition ==
"Dumebi" is primarily an Afrobeats song, but it also incorporates elements of afropop and dancehall, creating a party-friendly bop. The track, produced by Ozedikus, features a prominent piano riff and a slow, chord-based beat, which builds into a catchy flow. The song's lyrics, sung by Rema, describe a girl who uses her beauty to captivate the hearts of boys, with a catchy hook and melody that complements the infectious beat.

== Music video ==
A music video for the song was released on May 20, 2019, featuring a cameo appearance by Diana Eneje. The video, directed by Ademola Falomo, shows Rema roaming the streets with his friends. As of March 2024, it has garnered 73 million views on YouTube.

== Certifications ==
Region	Certification	Certified units/sales
France (SNEP)	Platinum	200,000^{‡}
Nigeria (RCN)	Gold	2,500
Switzerland (IFPI Switzerland)	Gold	10,000^{‡}
United Kingdom (BPI)	Silver	200,000^{‡}
^{‡} Sales+streaming figures based on certification alone.
