= Freestyle (EP) =

EP by Rema
- Released: 19 June 2019
- Recorded: 2019
- Studio: Jonzing World Studio
- Genre: Afrobeats; Trap
- Length: 8:59
- Label: Jonzing; Mavins
- Producer: D'Prince (exec.); Altims; Level; Kcaaz; Deevee

Rema chronology
Rema (2019)	Freestyle (2019)	Bad Commando (2019)

Freestyle (also known as Rema Freestyle EP) is the second extended play by Nigerian singer Rema. It was released on 19 June 2019 through Jonzing World, and Mavin Records. Executively produced by D'Prince, with additional production from Altims, Level, Kcaaz, and Deevee. Shortly after the EP was released, it debuted at Number 1 on Apple Music Top 100 in Nigeria.

== Background and release ==
Following the success of his extended play Rema, released two months previously, Rema began posting freestyle videos of each song from "American Love", "Trap Out the Submarine", "Boulevard" and "Spiderman" on his Instagram page.

== Composition ==
The EP contains four tracks which was produced by Altims, Level, Kcaaz, and Deevee.

== Track listing ==
Freestyle track listing
No.	Title	Writer(s)	Producer(s)	Length
1.	"Boulevard"	Divine Ikubor; Aluku Timothy	Altims	1:52
2.	"American Love"	Divine Ikubor; Stefan Frerichs	Level	2:20
3.	"Spiderman"	Divine Ikubor; Zachary Kim	Kcaaz	2:23
4.	"Trap Out the Submarine"	Divine Ikubor; Austin Divine	Deevee	2:24
Total length:				8:59

== Release history ==
Region	Date	Format	Version	Label
Various	19 June 2019	streaming, digital download	Standard	Jonzing World, Mavin
