= Heis (album) =

2024 studio album by Rema

Studio album by Rema
- Released: 10 July 2024
- Genres: Afrobeats; Afrorave; Amapiano
- Length: 27:33
- Labels: Mavin; Jonzing; Interscope
- Producers: Rema; P.Priime; Producer X; Cubeatz; Deats; Klimperboy; Altims; London; Alex Lustig; Take a Daytrip

Rema chronology
Ravage (2023)	Heis (2024)	E-Mortal Boy (2026)

Singles from HEIS
- 1. "Benin Boys" Released: 20 June 2024; 2. "Hehehe" Released: 7 July 2024

Heis (stylized in all caps) is the second studio album by Nigerian rapper and singer-songwriter Rema. It was released through Mavin Records, Jonzing World, and Interscope Records on 10 July 2024. The album features guest appearances from Shallipopi and Odumodublvck. It serves as the follow-up to his previous album, Rave & Roses (2022). The album received a nomination for Best Global Music Album at the 67th Annual Grammy Awards, earning Rema his first career nomination at the Grammys and won Album of the Year at the Trace Awards & Festival 2025.

== Critical reception ==
Professional ratings
Review scores
Source	Rating
NME	5/5 stars
Clash	8/10
OkayAfrica	7/10
Pulse Nigeria	8/10
Pitchfork	7.8/10
Billboard	9/10
Premium Times	4/10
NotJustOk	8.5/10

Kyann-Sian Williams of NME stated that "HEIS opens with the Afrorave powerhouse's signature chuckle, but takes you to unknown territory with the enthralling, synth-heavy 'MARCH AM' and "AZAMAN". Blending orchestral strings, thumping drums, and (on the former) a car's revving engine, these energetic gems reaffirm Rema as a true rhythm scientist."

Adeayo Adebiyi of Pulse Nigeria gave the album an 8.0/10 rating, but noted that it feels like an outburst driven by a perceived lack of acknowledgment. What should have been a display of elevated artistry quickly turned into a petulant demand for recognition through an obviously one-take project, which he hopes showcases his superlative talent.

Wongo Okon of Uproxx called the album "polarizing" and said it's the "jolt that afrobeats needs," noting that "the beauty of afrobeats must be preserved and it’s artists like Rema who will make sure that happens."

Kyle Denis of Billboard stated that "Rema's vision of Afrorave relies on the unbridled energy generated when people collectively surrender to music's power". His album begs to be experienced live; it's as if Rema envisioned each song's live rendition before entering the studio. The result is a dark, raucous, and distinctly liberating sound – the long-awaited embodiment of Rema's touted "Afrorave" style, despite initial sonic ambiguity.

Utere Naomi of NotJustOk awarded the album an 8.5/10 rating and praised HEIS as masterful, boasting smooth tracks and a cohesive narrative. Each song delivers a powerful statement of domination in the music industry. Notably, Rema eschews western influences, instead making a deliberate move to reign supreme in his hometown.

== Track listing ==
HEIS track listing
No.	Title	Length
1.	"March Am"	2:23
2.	"Azaman"	2:28
3.	"Hehehe"	1:53
4.	"Yayo"	2:30
5.	"Benin Boys" (with Shallipopi)	2:49
6.	"HEIS"	2:33
7.	"Ozeba"	2:17
8.	"War Machine" (with Odumodublvck)	2:37
9.	"Egungun"	2:38
10.	"Villain"	2:49
11.	"Now I Know"	2:36
Total length:		27:33

== Awards and nominations ==
Awards and nominations for "HEIS" Album
Year	Organization	Category	Result	Ref.
2025	Grammy Awards	Best Global Music Album	Nominated	
2025	Trace Awards	Album of the Year	Won	
2025	The Headies	Album of the Year	Won	
2025	The Headies	Afrobeats Album of the Year	Won	

== Charts ==
Chart performance for HEIS
Chart (2024)	Peak position
Belgian Albums (Ultratop Flanders)	169
Belgian Albums (Ultratop Wallonia)	131
French Albums (SNEP)	136
Nigerian Albums (TurnTable)	1
Swiss Albums (Schweizer Hitparade)	99
UK Albums (Official Charts)	90
US World Albums (Billboard)	7
