= OVÖ =

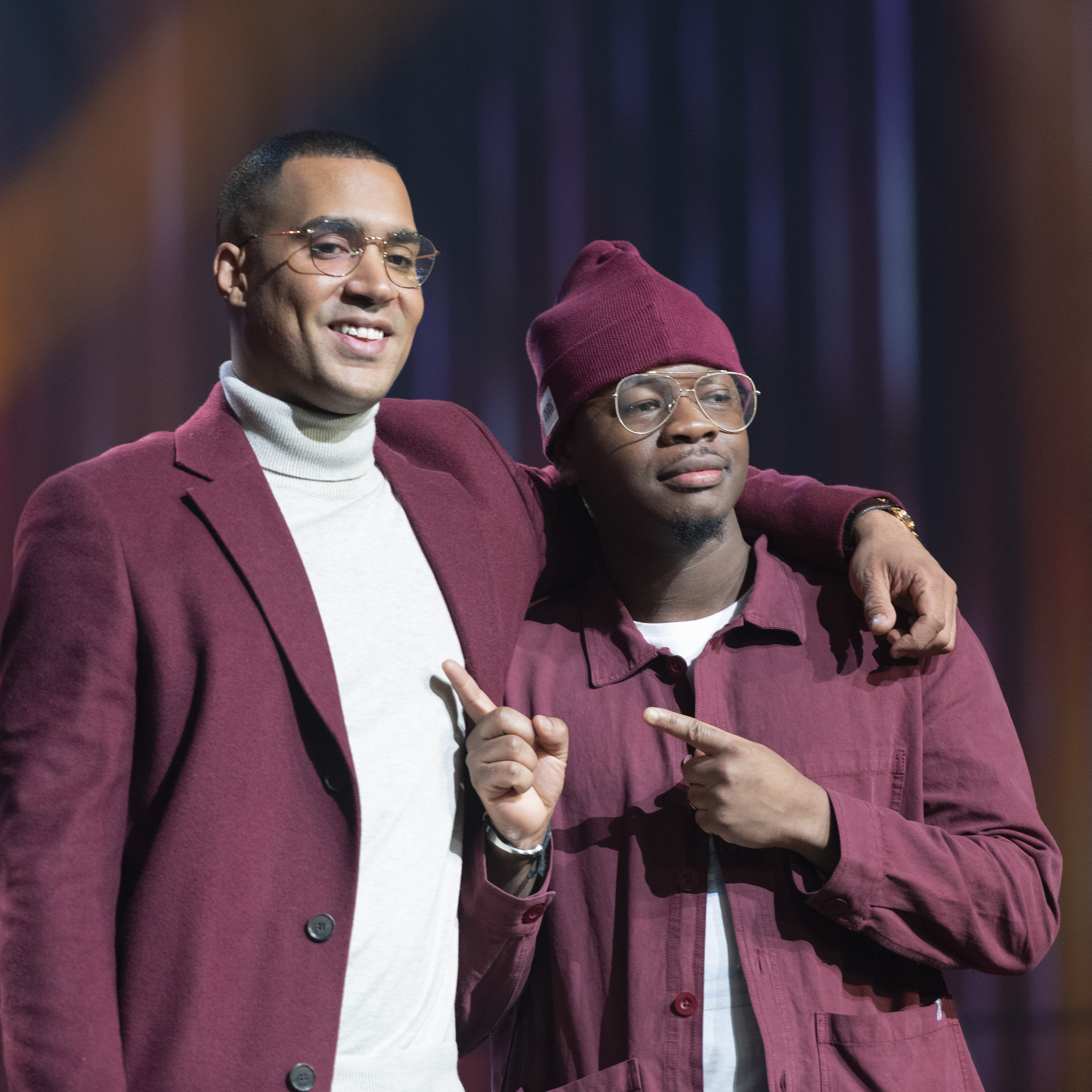
OVÖ during Melodifestivalen 2020

OVÖ (Om Vi Överlever), are a Swedish hiphop-duo that was created in 2017 by rappers Nicky Csenius and Jaouli Akofely.

The duo participated in Melodifestivalen 2020 with the song "Inga problem".

== Discography ==
=== Singles ===
Title	Year	Peak chart positions	Album
Title	Year	SWE	Album
"Inga problem"	2020	—	Non-album single
