= Diana Eneje =

Nigerian model

- Chioma
- Born: Diana Chioma Eneje; 19 August 2002 (age 23); Lagos
- Citizenship: Nigerian
- Occupations: Model, YouTuber, Influencer
- Years active: 2016-present
- Parents: Kingsley Eneje (father); Linda Eneje (mother)
- Relatives: Jennifer Eneje; Doris Eneje
- Website: dianaeneje.com

Diana Chioma Eneje (born August 19, 2002), known professionally as Diana Eneje, is a Nigerian fashion enthusiast, model, vlogger and Social media personality, born and raised in Lagos, and hails from Enugu, a state in the south-east region of Nigeria. She is known for starring in Rema music video Dumebi

== Early life ==
Diana Chioma Eneje was born on August 19, 2002, in Lagos to Kingsley Eneje, and Linda Eneje. Her early influence in fashion, came from her eldest sisters Jennifer Eneje, and Doris Eneje, who inspired her fashion taste, while growing up.

== Career ==
In 2016, she started her career in modeling as a teen model, at the age of 14. According to her, in an interview on Jermaine Okpe's podcast, she began her career as a model, while in high school without consciously thinking she was going into an industry. On 19 August 2017, she launched her foundation, to support orphans. Eneje started a fashion vlog on YouTube in August 2019. She documents fashion, hair, food, and her travel experiences. On 19 August 2019, she launched her hair gel collection in collaboration with The Shine Cartel. She also appeared in Rema music video Dumebi, released by Jonzing World, and Mavin Records on 21 May 2019, as the lead character in the video.

Eneje has influenced for HP, Cadbury, PayPorte, Mango, Stanbic IBTC, Krispy Kreme, Kellogg Tolaram, Infinix, Bolt, Coca-Cola, Octafx and much more. On 18 June 2020, she spoke about her career, as an influencer on Guardian TV, with Popsicles host Emmanuella .

On 19 August 2021, Swarovski, a jewelry and accessories company in Nigeria, unveiled Diana, as one of its brand influencers.

== Accolades ==
Year	Organization	Category(s)	Nominated work	Results
2017	Nigerian Teens Choice Awards	Choice Most Fashionable Female	Herself	Won
2018	Nigerian Teens Choice Awards	Choice Social Media Influencer	Herself	Nominated
2021	YNaija	100 Most Influential People in Media	Herself	Longlisted
