= Rave & Roses =

2022 studio album by Rema

- Standard Cover

Studio album by Rema
- Released: 25 March 2022
- Genre: Afrorave
- Length: 59:09
- Label: Jonzing World; Mavin

Rema chronology
Rema Compilation (2020)	Rave & Roses (2022)	Ravage (2023)

Singles from Rave & Roses
- 1. "Soundgasm" Released: 10 June 2021; 2. "Calm Down" Released: 11 February 2022; 3. "FYN" Released: 11 March 2022

Rave & Roses is the debut studio album by Nigerian singer Rema. It was released on 25 March 2022 through Jonzing World and Mavin Records. The album included guest appearances from 6lack, Chris Brown, AJ Tracey, and Yseult. The deluxe version of the album was released on 28 April 2023, renamed as Rave & Roses Ultra.

== Background ==
In May 2021, Rema announced he would be calling his sound "Afrorave", a subgenre of Afrobeats with influences of Arabian and Indian music, saying "my album seals this claim for good". In an interview, Rema discussed the importance of the album to him saying it's a "breath of fresh air for him as an artist."

== Recording and production ==
Rema recorded most of the album in Benin City. He told NME about the recording process saying, "I tapped into a different mind space for this album, though. Learning through personal experiences, I knew I had been pushed into a different space compared to where I was before. As I'm currently at the forefront of a musical generation, I know the album is going to have an impact."

== Singles and promotion ==
In June 2021, Rema released the first single titled "Soundgasm", with a music video. On 11 February 2022, Rema officially announced the album's release date and released the second single "Calm Down". On 11 March 2022, he released the third single "FYN" featuring AJ Tracey. The album became the first album by an African artist to reach one billion streams on Spotify, following the release of the Ultra Version.

== Critical reception ==
Professional ratings
Review scores
Source	Rating
The Cable	3/5
Clash	8/10
Crack	7/10
The Native	7.7/10
Pitchfork	7.2/10
Pulse Nigeria	7.2/10
The Scoove Africa	7.2/10

Jessica Kariisa of Pitchfork stated that "Rema sounds just as confident and irrepressibly youthful as ever". Motolani Alake of Pulse Nigeria gave the album a 7.2/10 rating, but said that the album has unmissable flaws and there is evidence of lazy songwriting. Olayiide Bolaji of The Scoove Africa also gave the album a 7.2/10 but noted that while the album shows Rema's artistic evolution, it is predictable and most of the songs sound too alike.

== Track listing ==
Rave & Roses – Standard edition
No.	Title	Writer(s)	Producer(s)	Length
1.	"Divine"	Divine Ikubor	Sarz	3:33
2.	"Hold Me" (with 6lack)	Ikubor; Ricardo Valentine	Dez Wright; Kill September; London	4:09
3.	"Dirty"	Ikubor	London; Andre Vibez	3:42
4.	"Calm Down"	Ikubor	Andre Vibez; London	3:39
5.	"Soundgasm"	Ikubor	London; Dro; Shanti	3:24
6.	"Time n Affection" (with Chris Brown)	Ikubor; Christopher Brown	London; 1Mind	3:50
7.	"Jo"	Ikubor	London	3:07
8.	"Mara"	Ikubor	Andre Vibez	2:58
9.	"Love"	Ikubor	London	4:10
10.	"Addicted"	Ikubor	London	4:30
11.	"Are You There?"	Ikubor	1Mind	3:13
12.	"FYN" (with AJ Tracey)	Ikubor; Ché Grant	Kel-P; KDaGreat	3:27
13.	"Oroma Baby"	Ikubor	London; Altims	3:29
14.	"Carry"	Ikubor	Higo; London	3:42
15.	"Wine" (with Yseult)	Ikubor; Yseult Onguenet	London	3:50
16.	"Runaway"	Ikubor	London	4:18
Total length:				59:09

Rave & Roses Ultra – Deluxe edition bonus tracks
No.	Title	Writer(s)	Producer(s)	Length
17.	"HOV"	Ikubor	Alex Lustig; Otxhello	2:18
18.	"Calm Down" (with Selena Gomez)	Ikubor; Amanda Ibáñez; Michael Hunter; Selena Gomez	Andre Vibez; London	3:59
19.	"Dunno Me (Freestyle)"	Ikubor	Rodlof; xynothing	2:22
20.	"Charm"	Ikubor	London	3:24
21.	"Reason You"	Ikubor	Alex Lustig; 80root; LNKmusic	3:22
22.	"Holiday"	Ikubor	Blaise beatz	2:40
Total length:				73:28

== Charts ==
=== Weekly charts ===
Weekly chart performance for Rave and roses ultra
Chart (2022–2023)	Peak position
Belgian Albums (Ultratop Wallonia)	189
Canadian Albums (Billboard)	15
Dutch Albums (Album Top 100)	13
French Albums (SNEP)	31
Nigerian Albums (TurnTable)	2
US Billboard 200	81
US World Albums (Billboard)	2

=== Year-end charts ===
2022 year-end chart performance for Rave & Roses
Chart (2022)	Position
French Albums (SNEP)	104

2023 year-end chart performance for Rave & Roses
Chart (2023)	Position
Canadian Albums (Billboard)	28
French Albums (SNEP)	73
US Billboard 200	157
US World Albums (Billboard)	3

2024 year-end chart performance for Rave & Roses
Chart (2024)	Position
French Albums (SNEP)	164

== Certifications ==
Certifications and sales for Rave & Roses
Region	Certification	Certified units/sales
Brazil (Pro-Música Brasil) Deluxe version	2× Platinum	80,000^{‡}
Canada (Music Canada)	Platinum	80,000^{‡}
France (SNEP)	Platinum	100,000^{‡}
Poland (ZPAV)	Platinum	20,000^{‡}
Switzerland (IFPI Switzerland)	Platinum	20,000^{‡}
United Kingdom (BPI)	Silver	60,000^{‡}
United States (RIAA) Deluxe version	Gold	500,000^{‡}
^{‡} Sales+streaming figures based on certification alone.
