= Calm Down (Rema song) =

Single by Rema

from the album Rave & Roses
- Released: 11 February 2022
- Genre: Afrobeats; Afropop
- Length: 3:40; 3:59 (remix)
- Label: Mavin; Jonzing World; Interscope; SMG Music LLC (remix)
- Songwriters: Divine Ikubor; Andre Vibez; Michael Hunter (Note: Selena Gomez, Amanda Ibanez, and Alexandre Uwaifo are credited as songwriters on the remix version.)
- Producers: Andre Vibez; London

Rema singles chronology
"Soundgasm" (2021)	"Calm Down" (2022)	"FYN" (2022)

Selena Gomez singles chronology
"Let Somebody Go" (2022)	"Calm Down" (remix) (2022)	"My Mind & Me" (2022)

Music videos
- "Calm Down" on YouTube; "Calm Down" (remix) on YouTube

"Calm Down" is a song by Nigerian singer Rema, from his debut studio album Rave & Roses (2022). It was released on 11 February 2022 through Jonzing World, Mavin, and Interscope Records as the album's second single. The song charted across Europe, reaching number one on the Belgian Ultratop 50, Dutch Top 40 and Dutch Single Top 100. In the United Kingdom, "Calm Down" peaked at number three on the UK Singles Chart and spent 27 non-consecutive weeks in the top ten of the chart.

A remix of "Calm Down" with American singer Selena Gomez was released on 25 August 2022. The new version reached number one on both the Billboard US Afrobeats Songs and the Billboard Global Excl. US charts, and peaked at number three on the Global 200 chart. It peaked at number three on the US Billboard Hot 100, marking Rema's first top-ten hit and Gomez's ninth. It also led the U.S. Afrobeats Songs for a record-setting 58 weeks. In the US, it topped the all-genre Radio Songs chart for ten weeks, becoming both artists' first number-one song on the chart. It reached number one on the Canadian Hot 100 chart dated 13 May 2023. According to the International Federation of the Phonographic Industry (IFPI), the remix was the second best-selling global single of 2023, earning 1.89 billion subscription streams equivalents globally. The song is widely regarded as the biggest and most successful Afrobeats song of all time. A music video for the remix was released on Gomez's YouTube channel on 7 September 2022 and hit the 1 billion views mark on 8 November 2024, becoming Rema's first and Gomez's third song to hit the milestone.

== Release ==
On 17 August 2022, Selena Gomez posted a photo of herself and Rema on her social media, captioning it "come soon". The remix was released a week later.

== Writing and composition ==
"Calm Down" is all about the events that led me to finding love at the time. It started at a party where I saw a girl who stood out from other girls so I felt like shooting my shot. We spoke and danced... but her friends didn't let me get any closer which killed the vibe, but afterwards when they weren't there, we stayed in touch and hit it off.

— Rema on how the song came about, Pitchfork

Miami-based Amanda Ibanez, who also goes by her stage name Kiddo AI, was asked by Interscope senior director of A&R Vanessa Angiuli to write a spec verse for Selena Gomez on the song. Ibanez quickly wrote and recorded two different possible options for a Selena verse. Within a few hours of sending them to Angiuli, Ibanez received a response back from Angiuli who told her that Gomez loved the verse. Within the next few weeks, Ibanez and Gomez began to trade ideas back and forth and refine the verse. Ibanez eventually flew to Los Angeles to complete the song after a request to have more of Gomez on the song.

Like most girls my age, I grew up watching Selena on Wizards of Waverly Place and always admired her demeanor of being so classy and collected. So the first line is, 'I know I look shy, but for you I get down,' and I thought that that would be kind of fun for her to say, because she's so proper, I feel, from the outside. I just wanted her to feel herself a little bit.

— Amanda Ibanez on channeling Gomez to write her verse,

The song was described as a "vibey" "feelgood smash hit". Reviewing the remix, Vanguard writer Adegboyega Remmy Adeleye thought Gomez' "melodic tune complements Rema's vibe perfectly, maintaining the same energy as the original release".

The song is recorded in the key of B major with a tempo of 107 beats per minute in common time. It follows a chord progression of E–B, and the vocals span from D♯_{4} to F♯_{5}.

== Critical reception ==
Naming the song one of the best of 2022, Rolling Stone said "Rema likes to call his spin on the Afrobeats sound "Afro-rave," and it is sublimely lovely all the same. He is the kind of singer who savors simple pop pleasures; with a track that's appropriately warm, bright, and captivating. The big-eyed wonder in his voice makes it sound like he's the first guy ever to behold the majesty of girls or colors." Billboard said the song is organic, and its slow burn is further underscoring Afrobeats' increasing mainstream popularity, while naming it the 10th best song of 2023.

== Accolades ==
=== Awards and nominations ===
Awards and nominations for "Calm Down"
Organization	Year	Category	Result	Ref.
All Africa Music Awards	2023	Best Male Artiste in Western Africa (Rema for "Calm Down")	Nominated	
All Africa Music Awards	2023	Song of the Year	Nominated	
Brit Awards	2024	International Song of the Year	Nominated	
The Headies	2023	Song of the Year	Nominated	
The Headies	2023	Best Music Video	Won	
LOS40 Music Awards	2023	Best International Song	Nominated	
NRJ Music Awards	2022	International Song of the Year	Nominated	
Soundcity MVP Awards	2023	Listener's Choice	Nominated	
Soundcity MVP Awards	2023	Viewers' Choice	Nominated	
Soundcity MVP Awards	2023	Best Pop	Nominated	
Soundcity MVP Awards	2023	Video of the Year	Nominated	
Swiss Music Awards	2024	Best Hit International	Nominated	

Awards and nominations for "Calm Down" (remix with Selena Gomez)
Organization	Year	Category	Result	Ref.
African Entertainment Awards USA	2022	Best Music Video	Nominated	
African Entertainment Awards USA	2023	Song of the Year	Won	
African Muzik Magazine Awards	2023	Best Collaboration	Nominated	
Anghami Year in Music	2022	Top International Song	Won	
Anghami Year in Music	2023	Top International Song	Won	
ASCAP London Awards	2024	Song of the Year	Won	
ASCAP London Awards	2024	Top Streaming Song	Won	
ASCAP Pop Music Awards	2024	Song of the Year	Won	
ASCAP Rhythm & Soul Music Awards	2024	Winning R&B/Hip-Hop & Rap Songs	Won	
Billboard Music Awards	2023	Top Radio Song	Nominated	
Billboard Music Awards	2023	Top Collaboration	Nominated	
Billboard Music Awards	2023	Top Billboard Global 200 Song	Nominated	
Billboard Music Awards	2023	Top Billboard Global (Excl. U.S.) Song	Nominated	
Billboard Music Awards	2023	Top Afrobeats Song	Won	
Global Awards	2023	Best Social Trended Song	Nominated	
Hit FM Music Awards (China) (Note: The Hit FM Music Awards was established in 2008 to honor Western pop music.)	2024	Collaboration of the Year	Won	
iHeartRadio Music Awards	2023	Best Music Video	Nominated	
iHeartRadio Music Awards	2024	Song of the Year	Nominated	
iHeartRadio Music Awards	2024	Pop Song of the Year	Nominated	
iHeartRadio Music Awards	2024	Best Collaboration	Won	
Kora Awards	2024	Best Collaboration of the Year	Pending	
MTV Europe Music Awards	2023	Best Song	Nominated	
MTV Europe Music Awards	2023	Best Collaboration	Nominated	
MTV Video Music Awards	2023	Song of the Year	Nominated	
MTV Video Music Awards	2023	Best Collaboration	Nominated	
MTV Video Music Awards	2023	Best Afrobeats	Won	
MTV Video Play Awards	2023	Winning Video	Won	
NRJ Music Award	2022	International Collaboration of the Year	Nominated	
Spotify Plaques	2023	One Billion Streams Award	Won	
Trace Awards & Festival	2023	Song of the Year	Won	

=== Records ===
Records achieved by "Calm Down"
Category	Year	Record	Ref.
Guinness World Records	2022	First No.1 hit on The Official MENA Chart	
Guinness World Records	2023	Most weeks at No.1 on The Official MENA Chart	

Records achieved by "Calm Down" (remix with Selena Gomez)
Category	Year	Ref.
Longest-running song atop the Billboard U.S. Afrobeats Songs chart (Note: With 58 weeks at number one.)	2023	
First song to top both the Billboard U.S. Afrobeats Songs chart and Billboard's Pop Airplay chart in history	2023	
Highest-charting hit from an Afrobeats lead artist in Billboard Hot 100 history (Note: The song reached number three on the Billboard Hot 100.)	2023	
First African artist-led track hit one billion streams on Spotify	2023	
First song in history to spend one year on the Billboard U.S. Afrobeats Songs chart	2023	
First song in history to spend one year at number one on the Billboard U.S. Afrobeats Songs chart	2023	
First Afrobeats song to reach No. 1 on Radio Songs	2023	
Longest-charting African song on the Billboard Hot 100 (Note: The song spent 57 weeks on the Billboard Hot 100.)	2023	
First African song in history to spend an entire year on the Billboard Hot 100	2023	
Most-streamed Afrobeats song on Spotify history (Note: With over 1.8 billion streams on Spotify.)	2023	
Most-watched music video by a Nigerian artist on YouTube (Note: With over 1.3 Billion views on Youtube.)	2023	
Most Weeks Ever on Pop Airplay Chart (Note: with 64 weeks as the longest Pop Airplay stay.)	2024	
Most Weeks Logged in the Pop Airplay Top-10 in History (Note: with 45 weeks as the most weeks logged in the Pop Airplay top ten.)	2024	

=== Lists ===
Name of publisher, name of listicle, year(s) listed, and placement result
Publisher	Listicle	Year(s)	Result	Ref.
Billboard	Billboard's 100 Best Songs	2023	10th	

== Charts ==
=== Original version ===
==== Weekly charts ====
2022–2023 weekly chart performance for "Calm Down"
Chart (2022–2024)	Peak position
Austria (Ö3 Austria Top 40)	7
Belgium (Ultratop 50 Flanders)	10
Belgium (Ultratop 50 Wallonia)	1
Brazil Airplay (Top 100 Brasil)	47
Canada (Canadian Hot 100)	94
CIS Airplay (TopHit)	69
Czech Republic Airplay (ČNS IFPI)	99
Denmark (Tracklisten)	25
France (SNEP)	2
Germany (GfK)	15
Iceland (Tónlistinn)	35
Ireland (IRMA)	5
Italy (FIMI)	26
Kazakhstan Airplay (TopHit)	77
Lebanon (Lebanese Top 20)	2
Lithuania Airplay (TopHit)	42
Luxembourg (Billboard)	2
Malaysia International (RIM)	5
Middle East and North Africa (IFPI)	1
Moldova Airplay (TopHit)	130
Netherlands (Dutch Top 40)	1
Netherlands (Single Top 100)	1
Norway (VG-lista)	27
Portugal (AFP)	1
Romania Airplay (UPFR)	2
Romania Airplay (Media Forest)	1
Romania TV Airplay (Media Forest)	1
San Marino Airplay (SMRTV Top 50)	22
Singapore (RIAS)	12
South Africa Airplay (TOSAC)	2
South Africa Streaming (TOSAC)	7
Spain (Promusicae)	23
Suriname (Nationale Top 40)	1
Sweden (Sverigetopplistan)	48
Switzerland (Schweizer Hitparade)	1
United Arab Emirates (IFPI)	3
UK Singles (Official Charts)	3
UK Afrobeats (Official Charts)	3
UK Hip Hop/R&B (Official Charts)	1
US Afrobeats Songs (Billboard)	7
US World Digital Song Sales (Billboard)	5

2025–2026 weekly chart performance for "Calm Down"
Chart (2025–2026)	Peak position
Brazil Airplay (Crowley)	132
Latvia Airplay (TopHit)	99
Moldova Airplay (TopHit)	83

==== Year-end charts ====
2022 year-end chart positions for "Calm Down"
Chart (2022)	Position
Belgium (Ultratop Flanders)	46
Belgium (Ultratop Wallonia)	2
France (SNEP)	2
Germany (Official German Charts)	90
Netherlands (Single Top 100)	3
Switzerland (Schweizer Hitparade)	10

2023 year-end chart positions for "Calm Down"
Chart (2023)	Position
Austria (Ö3 Austria Top 40)	10
Belgium (Ultratop 50 Flanders)	70
Belgium (Ultratop 50 Wallonia)	12
Brazil Airplay (Crowley Charts)	73
Bulgaria Airplay (PROPHON)	4
Denmark (Tracklisten)	43
Germany (Official German Charts)	19
Iceland (Tónlistinn)	52
Italy (FIMI)	72
New Zealand (Recorded Music NZ)	9
Sweden (Sverigetopplistan)	50
Switzerland (Schweizer Hitparade)	2
UK Singles (OCC)	6

2024 year-end chart positions for "Calm Down"
Chart (2024)	Position
France (SNEP)	65
Iceland (Tónlistinn)	100
Portugal Top 200 Streams (AFP)	94
Portugal Top 200 Singles (AFP)	95
Switzerland (Schweizer Hitparade)	46

2025 year-end chart positions for "Calm Down"
Chart (2025)	Position
France (SNEP)	172

=== Selena Gomez remix ===
==== Weekly charts ====
Weekly chart performance for "Calm Down" (remix) with Selena Gomez
Chart (2022–2026)	Peak position
Argentina Hot 100 (Billboard)	62
Australia (ARIA)	11
Austria (Billboard)	7
Belarus Airplay (TopHit)	8
Belgium (Billboard)	1
Bulgaria Airplay (PROPHON)	2
Canada Hot 100 (Billboard)	1
Canada AC (Billboard)	7
Canada CHR/Top 40 (Billboard)	1
Canada Hot AC (Billboard)	1
Chile Airplay (Monitor Latino)	8
Colombia Anglo Airplay (National-Report)	1
CIS Airplay (TopHit)	11
Croatia (Billboard)	23
Croatia International Airplay (Top lista)	13
Czech Republic Airplay (ČNS IFPI)	65
Czech Republic Singles Digital (ČNS IFPI)	36
El Salvador Airplay (Monitor Latino)	11
Estonia Airplay (TopHit)	19
France (Billboard)	2
Germany (Billboard)	17
Global 200 (Billboard)	3
Global Excl. US (Billboard)	1
Greece International (IFPI)	4
Hungary (Single Top 40)	6
Iceland (Tónlistinn)	38
India International (IMI)	1
Ireland (Billboard)	5
Israel International Airplay (Media Forest)	1
Kazakhstan Airplay (TopHit)	2
Latvia Airplay (TopHit)	83
Lithuania (AGATA)	23
Luxembourg (Billboard)	1
Malaysia (Billboard)	8
Mexico (Billboard)	16
Moldova Airplay (TopHit)	2
Netherlands (Dutch Top 40)	1
New Zealand (Recorded Music NZ)	7
Nicaragua Airplay (Monitor Latino)	6
Nigeria (TurnTable Top 100)	17
Nigeria Airplay (TurnTable)	1
Panama International (PRODUCE)	9
Panama Airplay (Monitor Latino)	2
Paraguay Airplay (Monitor Latino)	9
Peru (Billboard)	23
Poland Airplay (OLiS)	2
Poland Streaming (OLiS)	14
Portugal (Billboard)	1
Romania (Billboard)	11
Russia Airplay (TopHit)	16
Singapore (Billboard)	11
Slovakia Airplay (ČNS IFPI)	2
Slovakia Singles Digital (ČNS IFPI)	10
South Africa (Billboard)	1
Spain (Billboard)	22
Sweden Heatseeker (Sverigetopplistan)	4
Switzerland (Billboard)	1
Ukraine Airplay (TopHit)	123
United Kingdom (OCC)	3
UK Afrobeats (Official Charts)	3
Uruguay Airplay (Monitor Latino)	15
US Billboard Hot 100	3
US Adult Contemporary (Billboard)	6
US Adult Pop Airplay (Billboard)	1
US Afrobeats Songs (Billboard)	1
US Pop Airplay (Billboard)	1
US Rhythmic Airplay (Billboard)	1
US World Digital Song Sales (Billboard)	1
Venezuela Airplay (Record Report)	65

==== Monthly charts ====
Monthly chart positions for "Calm Down" (remix) with Selena Gomez
Chart (2023)	Peak position
Russia Airplay (TopHit)	24

==== Year-end charts ====
2022 year-end chart positions for "Calm Down" (remix) with Selena Gomez
Chart (2022)	Position
Global 200 (Billboard)	124
Latvia (EHR)	69
Netherlands (Dutch Top 40)	18
US Afrobeats Songs (Billboard)	6

2023 year-end chart positions for "Calm Down" (remix) with Selena Gomez
Chart (2023)	Position
Australia (ARIA)	12
Brazil Streaming (Pro-Música Brasil)	112
Canada (Canadian Hot 100)	2
Global 200 (Billboard)	2
Global Singles (IFPI)	2
India International Streaming (IMI)	1
Moldova Airplay (TopHit)	11
Netherlands (Single Top 100)	9
Poland (Polish Airplay Top 100)	32
Poland (Polish Streaming Top 100)	31
Portugal Airplay (AFP)	1
Romania Airplay (TopHit)	80
Spain Airplay (PROMUSICAE)	8
US Billboard Hot 100	6
US Adult Contemporary (Billboard)	20
US Adult Top 40 (Billboard)	4
US Afrobeats Songs (Billboard)	1
US Dance/Mix Show Airplay (Billboard)	44
US Mainstream Top 40 (Billboard)	1
US Rhythmic (Billboard)	1
US R&B/Hip-Hop Airplay (Billboard)	21

2024 year-end chart positions for "Calm Down" (remix) with Selena Gomez
Chart (2024)	Position
CIS Airplay (TopHit)	107
Global 200 (Billboard)	38
Moldova Airplay (TopHit)	152
Romania Airplay (TopHit)	122
US Adult Contemporary (Billboard)	8
US Adult Top 40 (Billboard)	13
US Mainstream Top 40 (Billboard)	21

2025 year-end chart positions for "Calm Down" (remix) with Selena Gomez
Chart (2025)	Position
Moldova Airplay (TopHit)	150
Romania Airplay (TopHit)	168
US Adult Contemporary (Billboard)	18

== Certifications ==
Certifications for "Calm Down"
Region	Certification	Certified units/sales
Austria (IFPI Austria)	Gold	15,000^{‡}
Belgium (BRMA)	2× Platinum	80,000^{‡}
Brazil (Pro-Música Brasil)	Diamond	160,000^{‡}
Denmark (IFPI Danmark)	Platinum	90,000^{‡}
France (SNEP)	Diamond	333,333^{‡}
Germany (BVMI)	Platinum	600,000^{‡}
India (IMI)	13× Platinum	1,560,000
Italy (FIMI)	3× Platinum	300,000^{‡}
Netherlands (NVPI)	Gold	40,000^{‡}
New Zealand (RMNZ)	5× Platinum	150,000^{‡}
Nigeria (TCSN)	2× Platinum	200,000^{‡}
Poland (ZPAV)	Diamond	250,000^{‡}
Portugal (AFP)	9× Platinum	90,000^{‡}
Spain (Promusicae)	4× Platinum	240,000^{‡}
Switzerland (IFPI Switzerland)	4× Platinum	80,000^{‡}
United Kingdom (BPI)	3× Platinum	1,800,000^{‡}
United States (RIAA)	5× Platinum	5,000,000^{‡}
Streaming
Greece (IFPI Greece)	Gold	1,000,000^{†}
^{‡} Sales+streaming figures based on certification alone.^{†} Streaming-only figures based on certification alone.

Certifications for "Calm Down" (remix)
Region	Certification	Certified units/sales
Australia (ARIA)	8× Platinum	560,000^{‡}
Canada (Music Canada)	Diamond	800,000^{‡}
New Zealand (RMNZ)	2× Platinum	60,000^{‡}
Nigeria (TCSN)	2× Platinum	200,000^{‡}
Norway (IFPI Norway)	Platinum	60,000^{‡}
Streaming
Chile	Gold	10,000,000
Greece (IFPI Greece)	Platinum	2,000,000^{†}
Worldwide	—	1,890,000,000
^{‡} Sales+streaming figures based on certification alone.^{†} Streaming-only figures based on certification alone.

== Release history ==
Release dates and formats for "Calm Down"
Region	Date	Format	Version	Label(s)	Ref.
United States	6 September 2022	Contemporary hit radio	Remix	Interscope	
