= Billboard U.S. Afrobeats Songs =

US record chart

- Purpose: To rank the most popular Afrobeats songs weekly
- Owner: Billboard; Afro Nation

The U.S. Afrobeats Songs chart is a standard record chart, ranking the most popular Afrobeats songs in the United States and it is published weekly by Billboard. The chart ranks the 50 most popular songs every week. It was established by Billboard, in association with Afro Nation, on 22 March 2022. The chart is compiled by Billboard, and Afro Nation. The chart is measured from leading audio and video music services, plus download sales from top music retailers. The first chart was published in the issue dated 29 March.

The first number-one song on the U.S. Afrobeats Songs chart was "Love Nwantiti (Ah Ah Ah)" by CKay, on 29 March 2022. The chart is updated every Tuesday. The longest running number-one song on the U.S. Afrobeats Songs chart is "Water" by Tyla with 64 weeks at number one.

== Number ones ==
=== 2022 ===
Number-one songs of 2022 on the Billboard U.S. Afrobeats Songs chart
Issue date	Single	Artist(s)	Record label(s)	Ref.
April 2	"Love Nwantiti"	CKay	Chocolate City; Warner	
April 9	"Peru"	Fireboy DML	YBNL Nation; Empire	
April 16	"Love Nwantiti"	CKay	Chocolate City; Warner	
April 23	"Love Nwantiti"	CKay	Chocolate City; Warner	
April 30	"Love Nwantiti"	CKay	Chocolate City; Warner	
May 7	"Love Nwantiti"	CKay	Chocolate City; Warner	
May 14	"Peru"	Fireboy DML	YBNL Nation; Empire	
May 21	"Peru"	Fireboy DML	YBNL Nation; Empire	
May 28	"Peru"	Fireboy DML	YBNL Nation; Empire	
June 4	"Love Nwantiti"	CKay	Chocolate City; Warner	
June 11	"Peru"	Fireboy DML	YBNL Nation; Empire	
June 18	"Peru"	Fireboy DML	YBNL Nation; Empire	
June 25	"Free Mind"	Tems	Leading Vibes	
July 2	"Essence"	Wizkid featuring Justin Bieber and Tems	Starboy; RCA	
July 9	"Essence"	Wizkid featuring Justin Bieber and Tems	Starboy; RCA	
July 16	"Last Last"	Burna Boy	Atlantic	
July 23	"Last Last"	Burna Boy	Atlantic	
July 30	"Last Last"	Burna Boy	Atlantic	
August 6	"Last Last"	Burna Boy	Atlantic	
August 13	"Last Last"	Burna Boy	Atlantic	
August 20	"Last Last"	Burna Boy	Atlantic	
August 27	"Last Last"	Burna Boy	Atlantic	
September 3	"Last Last"	Burna Boy	Atlantic	
September 10	"Calm Down (Remix)"	Rema and Selena Gomez	Jonzing World; Mavin; Interscope	
September 17	"Calm Down (Remix)"	Rema and Selena Gomez	Jonzing World; Mavin; Interscope	
September 24	"Calm Down (Remix)"	Rema and Selena Gomez	Jonzing World; Mavin; Interscope	
October 1	"Calm Down (Remix)"	Rema and Selena Gomez	Jonzing World; Mavin; Interscope	
October 8	"Calm Down (Remix)"	Rema and Selena Gomez	Jonzing World; Mavin; Interscope	
October 15	"Calm Down (Remix)"	Rema and Selena Gomez	Jonzing World; Mavin; Interscope	
October 22	"Calm Down (Remix)"	Rema and Selena Gomez	Jonzing World; Mavin; Interscope	
October 29	"Calm Down (Remix)"	Rema and Selena Gomez	Jonzing World; Mavin; Interscope	
November 5	"Calm Down (Remix)"	Rema and Selena Gomez	Jonzing World; Mavin; Interscope	
November 12	"Calm Down (Remix)"	Rema and Selena Gomez	Jonzing World; Mavin; Interscope	
November 19	"Calm Down (Remix)"	Rema and Selena Gomez	Jonzing World; Mavin; Interscope	
November 26	"Calm Down (Remix)"	Rema and Selena Gomez	Jonzing World; Mavin; Interscope	
December 3	"Calm Down (Remix)"	Rema and Selena Gomez	Jonzing World; Mavin; Interscope	
December 10	"Calm Down (Remix)"	Rema and Selena Gomez	Jonzing World; Mavin; Interscope	
December 17	"Calm Down (Remix)"	Rema and Selena Gomez	Jonzing World; Mavin; Interscope	
December 24	"Calm Down (Remix)"	Rema and Selena Gomez	Jonzing World; Mavin; Interscope	
December 31	"Calm Down (Remix)"	Rema and Selena Gomez	Jonzing World; Mavin; Interscope	

=== 2023 ===
Number-one songs of 2023 on the Billboard U.S. Afrobeats Songs chart
Issue date	Single	Artist(s)	Record label(s)	Ref.
January 7	"Calm Down (Remix)"	Rema and Selena Gomez	Jonzing World; Mavin; Interscope	
January 14	"Calm Down (Remix)"	Rema and Selena Gomez	Jonzing World; Mavin; Interscope	
January 21	"Calm Down (Remix)"	Rema and Selena Gomez	Jonzing World; Mavin; Interscope	
January 28	"Calm Down (Remix)"	Rema and Selena Gomez	Jonzing World; Mavin; Interscope	
February 4	"Calm Down (Remix)"	Rema and Selena Gomez	Jonzing World; Mavin; Interscope	
February 11	"Calm Down (Remix)"	Rema and Selena Gomez	Jonzing World; Mavin; Interscope	
February 18	"Calm Down (Remix)"	Rema and Selena Gomez	Jonzing World; Mavin; Interscope	
February 25	"Calm Down (Remix)"	Rema and Selena Gomez	Jonzing World; Mavin; Interscope	
March 4	"Calm Down (Remix)"	Rema and Selena Gomez	Jonzing World; Mavin; Interscope	
March 11	"Calm Down (Remix)"	Rema and Selena Gomez	Jonzing World; Mavin; Interscope	
March 18	"Calm Down (Remix)"	Rema and Selena Gomez	Jonzing World; Mavin; Interscope	
March 25	"Calm Down (Remix)"	Rema and Selena Gomez	Jonzing World; Mavin; Interscope	
April 1	"Calm Down (Remix)"	Rema and Selena Gomez	Jonzing World; Mavin; Interscope	
April 8	"Calm Down (Remix)"	Rema and Selena Gomez	Jonzing World; Mavin; Interscope	
April 15	"Calm Down (Remix)"	Rema and Selena Gomez	Jonzing World; Mavin; Interscope	
April 22	"Calm Down (Remix)"	Rema and Selena Gomez	Jonzing World; Mavin; Interscope	
April 29	"Calm Down (Remix)"	Rema and Selena Gomez	Jonzing World; Mavin; Interscope	
May 6	"Calm Down (Remix)"	Rema and Selena Gomez	Jonzing World; Mavin; Interscope	
May 13	"Calm Down (Remix)"	Rema and Selena Gomez	Jonzing World; Mavin; Interscope	
May 20	"Calm Down (Remix)"	Rema and Selena Gomez	Jonzing World; Mavin; Interscope	
May 27	"Calm Down (Remix)"	Rema and Selena Gomez	Jonzing World; Mavin; Interscope	
June 3	"Calm Down (Remix)"	Rema and Selena Gomez	Jonzing World; Mavin; Interscope	
June 10	"Calm Down (Remix)"	Rema and Selena Gomez	Jonzing World; Mavin; Interscope	
June 17	"Calm Down (Remix)"	Rema and Selena Gomez	Jonzing World; Mavin; Interscope	
June 24	"Calm Down (Remix)"	Rema and Selena Gomez	Jonzing World; Mavin; Interscope	
July 1	"Calm Down (Remix)"	Rema and Selena Gomez	Jonzing World; Mavin; Interscope	
July 8	"Calm Down (Remix)"	Rema and Selena Gomez	Jonzing World; Mavin; Interscope	
July 15	"Calm Down (Remix)"	Rema and Selena Gomez	Jonzing World; Mavin; Interscope	
July 22	"Calm Down (Remix)"	Rema and Selena Gomez	Jonzing World; Mavin; Interscope	
July 29	"Calm Down (Remix)"	Rema and Selena Gomez	Jonzing World; Mavin; Interscope	
August 5	"Calm Down (Remix)"	Rema and Selena Gomez	Jonzing World; Mavin; Interscope	
August 12	"Calm Down (Remix)"	Rema and Selena Gomez	Jonzing World; Mavin; Interscope	
August 19	"Calm Down (Remix)"	Rema and Selena Gomez	Jonzing World; Mavin; Interscope	
August 26	"Calm Down (Remix)"	Rema and Selena Gomez	Jonzing World; Mavin; Interscope	
September 2	"Calm Down (Remix)"	Rema and Selena Gomez	Jonzing World; Mavin; Interscope	
September 9	"Calm Down (Remix)"	Rema and Selena Gomez	Jonzing World; Mavin; Interscope	
September 16	"Calm Down (Remix)"	Rema and Selena Gomez	Jonzing World; Mavin; Interscope	
September 23	"Calm Down (Remix)"	Rema and Selena Gomez	Jonzing World; Mavin; Interscope	
September 30	"Calm Down (Remix)"	Rema and Selena Gomez	Jonzing World; Mavin; Interscope	
October 7	"Calm Down (Remix)"	Rema and Selena Gomez	Jonzing World; Mavin; Interscope	
October 14	"Calm Down (Remix)"	Rema and Selena Gomez	Jonzing World; Mavin; Interscope	
October 21	"Water"	Tyla	Fax; Epic	
October 28	"Water"	Tyla	Fax; Epic	
November 4	"Water"	Tyla	Fax; Epic	
November 11	"Water"	Tyla	Fax; Epic	
November 18	"Water"	Tyla	Fax; Epic	
November 25	"Water"	Tyla	Fax; Epic	
December 2	"Water"	Tyla	Fax; Epic	
December 9	"Water"	Tyla	Fax; Epic	
December 16	"Water"	Tyla	Fax; Epic	
December 23	"Water"	Tyla	Fax; Epic	
December 30	"Water"	Tyla	Fax; Epic	

=== 2024 ===
Number-one songs of 2024 on the Billboard U.S. Afrobeats Songs chart
Issue date	Single	Artist(s)	Record label(s)	Ref.
January 6	"Water"	Tyla	Fax; Epic	
January 13	"Water"	Tyla	Fax; Epic	
January 20	"Water"	Tyla	Fax; Epic	
January 27	"Water"	Tyla	Fax; Epic	
February 3	"Water"	Tyla	Fax; Epic	
February 10	"Water"	Tyla	Fax; Epic	
February 17	"Water"	Tyla	Fax; Epic	
February 24	"Water"	Tyla	Fax; Epic	
March 2	"Water"	Tyla	Fax; Epic	
March 9	"Water"	Tyla	Fax; Epic	
March 16	"Water"	Tyla	Fax; Epic	
March 23	"Water"	Tyla	Fax; Epic	
March 30	"Water"	Tyla	Fax; Epic	
April 6	"Water"	Tyla	Fax; Epic	
April 13	"Water"	Tyla	Fax; Epic	
April 20	"Water"	Tyla	Fax; Epic	
April 27	"Water"	Tyla	Fax; Epic	
May 4	"Water"	Tyla	Fax; Epic	
May 11	"Water"	Tyla	Fax; Epic	
May 18	"Water"	Tyla	Fax; Epic	
May 25	"Water"	Tyla	Fax; Epic	
June 1	"Water"	Tyla	Fax; Epic	
June 8	"Water"	Tyla	Fax; Epic	
June 15	"Water"	Tyla	Fax; Epic	
June 22	"Water"	Tyla	Fax; Epic	
June 29	"Water"	Tyla	Fax; Epic	
July 6	"Water"	Tyla	Fax; Epic	
July 13	"Water"	Tyla	Fax; Epic	
July 20	"Water"	Tyla	Fax; Epic	
July 27	"Water"	Tyla	Fax; Epic	
August 3	"Water"	Tyla	Fax; Epic	
August 10	"Water"	Tyla	Fax; Epic	
August 17	"Water"	Tyla	Fax; Epic	
August 24	"Active"	Asake and Travis Scott	YBNL Nation; Empire	
August 31	"Water"	Tyla	Fax; Epic	
September 7	"Water"	Tyla	Fax; Epic	
September 14	"Water"	Tyla	Fax; Epic	
September 21	"Water"	Tyla	Fax; Epic	
September 28	"Water"	Tyla	Fax; Epic	
October 5	"Water"	Tyla	Fax; Epic	
October 12	"Water"	Tyla	Fax; Epic	
October 19	"Calm Down (Remix)"	Rema and Selena Gomez	Jonzing World; Mavin; Interscope	
October 26	"Move (Remix)"	Adam Port, Stryv and Camila Cabello featuring Malachiii	Keinemusik	
November 2	"Move (Remix)"	Adam Port, Stryv and Camila Cabello featuring Malachiii	Keinemusik	
November 9	"Move (Remix)"	Adam Port, Stryv and Camila Cabello featuring Malachiii	Keinemusik	
November 16	"Move (Remix)"	Adam Port, Stryv and Camila Cabello featuring Malachiii	Keinemusik	
November 23	"Move (Remix)"	Adam Port, Stryv and Camila Cabello featuring Malachiii	Keinemusik	
November 30	"Water"	Tyla	Fax; Epic	
December 7	"Water"	Tyla	Fax; Epic	
December 14	"Water"	Tyla	Fax; Epic	
December 21	"Water"	Tyla	Fax; Epic	
December 28	"Push 2 Start"	Tyla	Fax; Epic	

=== 2025 ===
Number-one songs of 2025 on the Billboard U.S. Afrobeats Songs chart
Issue date	Single	Artist(s)	Record label(s)	Ref.
January 4	"Push 2 Start"	Tyla	Fax; Epic	
January 11	"Push 2 Start"	Tyla	Fax; Epic	
January 18	"Push 2 Start"	Tyla	Fax; Epic	
January 25	"Push 2 Start"	Tyla	Fax; Epic	
February 1	"Push 2 Start"	Tyla	Fax; Epic	
February 8	"Push 2 Start"	Tyla	Fax; Epic	
February 15	"Push 2 Start"	Tyla	Fax; Epic	
February 22	"Push 2 Start"	Tyla	Fax; Epic	
March 1	"Push 2 Start"	Tyla	Fax; Epic	
March 8	"Push 2 Start"	Tyla	Fax; Epic	
March 15	"Push 2 Start"	Tyla	Fax; Epic	
March 22	"Push 2 Start"	Tyla	Fax; Epic	
March 29	"Push 2 Start"	Tyla	Fax; Epic	
April 5	"Push 2 Start"	Tyla	Fax; Epic	
April 12	"Push 2 Start"	Tyla	Fax; Epic	
April 19	"Push 2 Start"	Tyla	Fax; Epic	
April 26	"Push 2 Start"	Tyla	Fax; Epic	
May 3	"Push 2 Start"	Tyla	Fax; Epic	
May 10	"Push 2 Start"	Tyla	Fax; Epic	
May 17	"Shake It to the Max (Fly)"	Moliy, Silent Addy, Skillibeng and Shenseea	Gamma	
May 24	"Shake It to the Max (Fly)"	Moliy, Silent Addy, Skillibeng and Shenseea	Gamma	
May 31	"Shake It to the Max (Fly)"	Moliy, Silent Addy, Skillibeng and Shenseea	Gamma	
June 7	"Shake It to the Max (Fly)"	Moliy, Silent Addy, Skillibeng and Shenseea	Gamma	
June 14	"Shake It to the Max (Fly)"	Moliy, Silent Addy, Skillibeng and Shenseea	Gamma	
June 21	"Shake It to the Max (Fly)"	Moliy, Silent Addy, Skillibeng and Shenseea	Gamma	
June 28	"Shake It to the Max (Fly)"	Moliy, Silent Addy, Skillibeng and Shenseea	Gamma	
July 5	"Shake It to the Max (Fly)"	Moliy, Silent Addy, Skillibeng and Shenseea	Gamma	
July 12	"Shake It to the Max (Fly)"	Moliy, Silent Addy, Skillibeng and Shenseea	Gamma	
July 19	"Shake It to the Max (Fly)"	Moliy, Silent Addy, Skillibeng and Shenseea	Gamma	
July 26	"Shake It to the Max (Fly)"	Moliy, Silent Addy, Skillibeng and Shenseea	Gamma	
August 2	"Shake It to the Max (Fly)"	Moliy, Silent Addy, Skillibeng and Shenseea	Gamma	
August 9	"Shake It to the Max (Fly)"	Moliy, Silent Addy, Skillibeng and Shenseea	Gamma	
August 16	"Shake It to the Max (Fly)"	Moliy, Silent Addy, Skillibeng and Shenseea	Gamma	
August 23	"Shake It to the Max (Fly)"	Moliy, Silent Addy, Skillibeng and Shenseea	Gamma	
August 30	"Shake It to the Max (Fly)"	Moliy, Silent Addy, Skillibeng and Shenseea	Gamma	
September 6	"Shake It to the Max (Fly)"	Moliy, Silent Addy, Skillibeng and Shenseea	Gamma	
September 13	"Shake It to the Max (Fly)"	Moliy, Silent Addy, Skillibeng and Shenseea	Gamma	
September 20	"Shake It to the Max (Fly)"	Moliy, Silent Addy, Skillibeng and Shenseea	Gamma	
September 27	"Shake It to the Max (Fly)"	Moliy, Silent Addy, Skillibeng and Shenseea	Gamma	
October 4	"Shake It to the Max (Fly)"	Moliy, Silent Addy, Skillibeng and Shenseea	Gamma	
October 11	"Shake It to the Max (Fly)"	Moliy, Silent Addy, Skillibeng and Shenseea	Gamma	
October 18	"Shake It to the Max (Fly)"	Moliy, Silent Addy, Skillibeng and Shenseea	Gamma	
October 25	"Shake It to the Max (Fly)"	Moliy, Silent Addy, Skillibeng and Shenseea	Gamma	
November 1	"Shake It to the Max (Fly)"	Moliy, Silent Addy, Skillibeng and Shenseea	Gamma	
November 8	"Chanel"	Tyla	FAX/Epic	
November 15	"Shake It to the Max (Fly)"	Moliy, Silent Addy, Skillibeng and Shenseea	Gamma	
November 22	"Shake It to the Max (Fly)"	Moliy, Silent Addy, Skillibeng and Shenseea	Gamma	
November 29	"Chanel"	Tyla	FAX/Epic	
December 6	"Chanel"	Tyla	FAX/Epic	
December 13	"Chanel"	Tyla	FAX/Epic	
December 20	"Chanel"	Tyla	FAX/Epic	
December 27	"Chanel"	Tyla	FAX/Epic	

=== 2026 ===
Number-one songs of 2026 on the Billboard U.S. Afrobeats Songs chart
Issue date	Single	Artist(s)	Record label(s)	Ref.
January 3	"Chanel"	Tyla	Fax/Epic	
January 10	"Chanel"	Tyla	Fax/Epic	
January 17	"Chanel"	Tyla	Fax/Epic	
January 24	"Chanel"	Tyla	Fax/Epic	
January 31	"Chanel"	Tyla	Fax/Epic	
February 7	"Chanel"	Tyla	Fax/Epic	
February 14	"Chanel"	Tyla	Fax/Epic	
February 21	"Chanel"	Tyla	Fax/Epic	
February 28	"Chanel"	Tyla	Fax/Epic	
March 7	"Chanel"	Tyla	Fax/Epic	
March 14	"Chanel"	Tyla	Fax/Epic	
March 21	"Chanel"	Tyla	Fax/Epic	
March 28	"Chanel"	Tyla	Fax/Epic	
April 4	"Chanel"	Tyla	Fax/Epic	
April 11	"Chanel"	Tyla	Fax/Epic	
April 18	"Chanel"	Tyla	Fax/Epic	
April 25	"Chanel"	Tyla	Fax/Epic	
May 2	"Chanel"	Tyla	Fax/Epic	
May 9	"Let Me Be"	Second Voice	Int Vibes	
May 16	"Let Me Be"	Second Voice	Int Vibes	
May 23	"Let Me Be"	Second Voice	Int Vibes	
May 30	"Let Me Be"	Second Voice	Int Vibes	
June 6	"Let Me Be"	Second Voice	Int Vibes	
June 13	"Let Me Be"	Second Voice	Int Vibes	
June 20	"Let Me Be"	Second Voice	Int Vibes	
June 27	"Let Me Be"	Second Voice	Int Vibes	
July 4	"Is It Love"	Tyla	FAX/Epic	
July 11	"Mi Chico"	DJ Goja, Jason Derulo and Melody	Gamma	
July 18	"Mi Chico"	DJ Goja, Jason Derulo and Melody	Gamma	
July 25	"Mi Chico"	DJ Goja, Jason Derulo and Melody	Gamma	
August 1	"Mi Chico"	DJ Goja, Jason Derulo and Melody	Gamma	
August 8	"Water"	Tyla	Fax/Epic	
August 15	"Water"	Tyla	Fax/Epic	
August 22	"Water"	Tyla	Fax/Epic	
August 29	"Water"	Tyla	Fax/Epic	
September 5	"Water"	Tyla	Fax/Epic	
September 12	"Water"	Tyla	Fax/Epic	
September 19	"Water"	Tyla	Fax/Epic	
September 26	"Water"	Tyla	Fax/Epic	
October 3	"Water"	Tyla	Fax/Epic	
October 10	"Mi Chico"	DJ Goja, Jason Derulo and Melody	Gamma	
October 17	"Mi Chico"	DJ Goja, Jason Derulo and Melody	Gamma	
October 24	"Mi Chico"	DJ Goja, Jason Derulo and Melody	Gamma	
October 31	"Mi Chico"	DJ Goja, Jason Derulo and Melody	Gamma	
November 7	"Mi Chico"	DJ Goja, Jason Derulo and Melody	Gamma	
November 14	"Mi Chico"	DJ Goja, Jason Derulo and Melody	Gamma	
November 21	"Mi Chico"	DJ Goja, Jason Derulo and Melody	Gamma	
