= Thisizlondon =

British-Nigerian music producer and disc jockey

- Hunter in 2023

Background information
- Born: Michael Ovie Hunter; 21 October 1999 (age 27); Kaduna, Nigeria
- Origin: England
- Genres: Afrobeats, Afropop
- Occupation: Record producer
- Instruments: FL Studio, Ableton Live
- Years active: 2018–present
- Labels: LVRN; Blow Time Entertainment; Sony Music Publishing France; Bluesky Music Publishing

Michael Ovie Hunter (born 21 October 1999), known professionally as Thisizlondon (pronounced as London, and formerly stylised in all caps), is a Nigerian-British record producer and DJ. He is best known for co-producing the 2022 global hit single, "Calm Down" for Rema and its remix with Selena Gomez. It reached number three on the Billboard Hot 100, peaked atop the IMI International (becoming the second song by a Nigerian artist to do so) and remains the most internationally successful Afrobeats song.

Signing with Blowtime Entertainment in 2019, he's produced for other notable artists including Crayon, Ayra Starr, Rema, Wizkid, Selena Gomez, 6lack, Yseult, and Ladipoe. His other successful productions include Rema's "Calm Down" and "Ozeba", Ayra Starr's "Fashion Killa" and "Bloody Samaritan", Tiwa Savage's "Koroba", and Johnny Drille's "Mystery Girl". In 2022, he signed a publishing deal in a joint venture with Sony Music Publishing France and Bluesky Music Publishing.

== Early life ==
Michael Ovie Hunter was born in Kaduna, to a Nigerian Mom, from Isoko and a British Dad. Michael grew up in the sub-division of the Northern Nigeria state, Kaduna, where he rounded up his high school named Christ Ambassadors College, Kaduna in 2016. Michael's musical career began in the church as a drummer and soon took personal lessons on beat making. He tells Tush Magazine, “I when, out of curiosity, I discovered the FL Studio software From a close friend in the company I worked for in Kaduna as a graphics designer.”

== Career ==

In 2018, he produced "Turn Up" for DJ Tunez featuring Wizkid and Reekado Banks. In 2019, he decided to move to Lagos, to stay with Mavin's in-house producer BabyFresh, who eventually signed him to Blowtime Entertainment, a division of Mavin. His production tag was first introduced to the public on 12 July 2019, following the release of Crayon debut EP "Cray Cray", on the opening track "So Fine", produced by London, and BabyFresh. In October 2019, he had his solo production breakthrough with Rema's third EP Bad Commando, producing the opening title track "Bad Commando". Then went on to work on Wizkid project Soundman Vol. 1, on the track "Electric", in which he was featured.

London served as the executive producer on Rema's debut studio album Rave & Roses, producing 14 songs out of 16 tracks on the album. On 22 April 2022, while speaking with Notion magazine, he disclosed being the primary producer of the studio album Rave & Roses, and almost gave up on working on the album because he got scared at some point following the deadline date to meet up with, he says. On 14 July 2022, he tells Mixmag writer Shirley Ahura, “Working on Rema’s album is one of my proudest achievements, honestly. To see how people are accepting it and vibing to it gives me more motivation to keep going, to keep doing what I know how to do best.”, he says.

On 5 March 2021, following the release of Coming 2 America soundtrack album, he did a re-make of the song "Koroba" by Tiwa Savage for Amazon Studios, and Def Jam Recordings. In 2024, London signs with LVRN. Billboard journalist Heran Mamo says London is currently working on his debut project to be released under LVRN. Following the announcement, London went by Thisizlondon. On 15 August 2024, he released "Pinacolada", featuring Nigerian singer Ayra Starr, and American rapper 6lack. "Pinacolada" earned Thisizlondon his first chart entry on Nigeria's Official Top 100 songs, Nigeria Top Afropop songs and Nigeria radio. "Pinacolada" also earned him his first Afrobeats chart entry by the UK Official Charts Company and America Billboard charts.

== Artisty ==
Notion described his sound as a blend of “weaving church influences and R&B elements”. He cited Sarz, OVO 40, Altims aka Bursbrain, Killatunez, and Don Jazzy, as his musical influence.

== Awards and nominations ==
Year	Awards ceremony	Award description(s)	Results
2021	AFRIMMA	Music Producer of the Year	Nominated
2021	The Beatz Awards	Producer of the Year	Nominated
2021	The Beatz Awards	Afro-Pop Producer of the Year	Nominated
2021	The Beatz Awards	Afro Dancehall Producer of the Year	Nominated
2021	The Beatz Awards	Don Jazzy New Discovery Producer of the Year	Nominated
2022	Grammy Awards	Best Global Music Album for Made in Lagos (Deluxe Edition) by Wizkid	Nominated
2023	The Headies	Producer of the Year for "Calm Down" by Rema	Nominated
2025	The Headies	Producer of the Year for "Ozeba" by Rema	Won
