= Rema (musician) =

Nigerian singer-songwriter and rapper (born 2000)

- Rema in 2025
- Born: Divine Ikubor; 1 May 2000 (age 26); Benin City, Edo, Nigeria
- Occupations: Singer; songwriter; rapper
- Years active: 2019–present
- Notable work: Discography
- Awards: Full list
- Musical career
- Origin: Lagos, Nigeria
- Genres: Afrobeats; Afrobeat; Afro-rave; African hip-hop; pop rap; trap
- Instruments: Vocals; keyboards
- Labels: Jonzing; Interscope; Mavin
- Website: heisrema.com

Divine Ikubor (born 1 May 2000), known professionally as Rema, is a Nigerian singer-songwriter and rapper. He gained recognition with his 2019 song "Dumebi". That same year, he signed with D'Prince's record label, Jonzing World. Known for his distinct brand of afro-pop, self-described as "afrorave", as well as experimental takes on the genre, Rema has been nominated for 55 accolades.

Rema released three extended plays, Rema (2019), Freestyle (2019), and Bad Commando (2019) before achieving international success with the single "Calm Down" in 2022 which spawned a remix with American singer Selena Gomez that peaked at number three on the Billboard Hot 100. The song also led the Billboard U.S. Afrobeats Songs chart for a record-setting 58 weeks.

Rema released his debut album Rave & Roses in 2022, which reached number 81 on the Billboard 200. His second album, Heis (2024), was preceded by the hit single "Benin Boys" with Shallipopi, and earned him his first Grammy Award nomination for Best Global Music Album at the 67th Annual Grammy Awards. His fourth EP, E-Mortal Boy released in 2026.

== Early life and education ==
Divine Ikubor was born on 1 May 2000 into a Christian family in Benin City, Edo State, Nigeria. He is from Igbanke an Ika community in Orhionmwon LGA of Edo state. He discovered his passion for music during his secondary school days at Ighile Group of Schools in Edo State, where he began singing and rapping. After losing his father and elder brother, Rema was raised by his mother, who played a significant role in shaping his life.

== Career ==
=== 2019–2021: Career beginnings, extended plays ===
Rema started his music career performing in churches with his collaborator Alpha P in 2019. He gained recognition after posting a viral freestyle on Instagram to D'Prince's song "Gucci Gang". Impressed by his talent, D'Prince flew him to Lagos and offered him a record deal with Jonzing World, a subsidiary of Mavin Records owned by music executive and producer Don Jazzy. In 2019, Rema released his self-titled debut EP Rema, which topped Apple Music's Nigerian charts. The music video for "Dumebi", a breakout song from the EP, was released on 21 May 2019, featuring a cameo appearance from Diana Eneje and has since gained 85 million views on YouTube. During the summer of 2019, the song "Iron Man" from the Rema EP was featured on former United States President Barack Obama's annual summer playlist. Rema's second EP, titled Freestyle, released on 19 June 2019. This was followed by Bad Commando on 4 October. Rema's first compilation album released on 9 July 2020. In September 2020, his song "Bad Boys" with Rvssian appeared on the FIFA 21 official soundtrack.

Toya Delazy, a South African music producer, coined the genre "afrorave" in 2019, combining elements of garage, Zulu lyrics, and other African styles. In May 2021, Rema adopted the term "afrorave" to describe his own music, which blends Afrobeats with Arabian and Indian influences. In September 2021, he was unveiled as a brand ambassador for Pepsi, alongside his label mate Ayra Starr.

=== 2022–2023: Rave & Roses and Ravage ===
After releasing three EPs, Rema debuted his first album, Rave & Roses, on 25 March 2022, under Jonzing World. and Mavin Global. The album features 16 tracks, including collaborations with 6lack, Chris Brown, AJ Tracey, and Yseult. It charted 10 songs on the US Billboard Afrobeats Chart in its debut week. The single "Calm Down" gained international recognition, it reached number three on the Billboard Hot 100 after a remix with Selena Gomez, breaking multiple records. Rema received various awards, including the MTV Video Music Award for Best Afrobeats Video and the Billboard Music Award for Top Afrobeats Song and many other awards.

On 7 November 2022, he was awarded for achieving 1 billion streams worldwide during his London concert. In February 2023, he won the Digital Artist of the Year award at the Soundcity MVP Awards held at the Eko Convention Centre in Lagos. In April 2023, he released the deluxe edition of Rave & Roses, titled Rave & Roses Ultra, which became the first African album to cross two billion streams on Spotify. On 26 October 2023, Rema released the Ravage EP, and on 30 October 2023, he performed at the Ballon d'Or ceremony held Theatre du Châtelet in Paris, France.

In 2025, Rema became the most-streamed Nigerian artist on YouTube, with his hits surpassing other major Afrobeats stars and his song “Calm Down” accumulating over one billion views, setting a new benchmark for Nigerian artists globally.

=== 2024–present: Heis and E-Mortal Boy ===
On 11 July 2024, Rema released his second studio album, Heis, through Mavin Records, Jonzing World, and Interscope Records. The title of the album is derived from the Greek word for "number one". The 11-track project features guest appearances from Shallipopi and Odumodublvck was preceded by the singles "Benin Boys" and "Hehehe", and adopts a darker, drum-driven sound compared to his debut album Rave & Roses. The album debuted at number two on the TurnTable Top 100 Albums chart, later reached number one, and remained on the chart for 29 weeks with more than 104 million streams. It also received a nomination for the Grammy Award for Best Global Music Album at the 67th Annual Grammy Awards, marking Rema's first Grammy nomination.

On 7 February 2025, Rema released the single "Baby (Is It a Crime)", which samples Sade's 1985 single "Is It a Crime". The song quickly gained popularity, becoming one of the most streamed Nigerian songs of 2025. On 11 April 2025, Rema released another single titled "Bout U". On 12 June 2026, Rema performed "Goals" together with Lisa of Blackpink and Brazilian singer Anitta at the opening ceremony of the 2026 FIFA World Cup in the United States.

On 7 August 2026, Rema released the single "Tea", which was co-produced by Mustard. This was followed up with "Oh No" on 11 September. Both singles were included on Rema's fifth EP, E-Mortal Boy, released on 20 November. All of its seven tracks debuted in the Top 30 on Apple Music in Nigera.

== Personal life ==
On 28 September 2020, Rema tweeted accusations against the Peoples Democratic Party (PDP) regarding their involvement in the death of his father, Justice Ikubor, a former chieftain of the party. Although Rema gained admission to study at the University of Lagos in 2022, he was forced to leave the institution in 2023 due to the ongoing ASUU teaching union strike.

== Impact ==
Rolling Stone said "Rema has undoubtedly and proudly become an emblem of Afrobeats global rise." Writing for Business Day Anthony Udugba remarked Rema has "expanded the horizons" of African musical impact on the global stage. The Guardian Nigeria opined "As the Afrobeats landscape continues to flourish, Rema’s success sets a high standard, showcasing the global appeal and dominance of Nigerian music on the international stage." The Native stated "It’s impossible to erase the mark he has left on Afrobeats history." Victor Okpala said "Rema’s sound has cemented his place as a true musical trailblazer." Many critics have praised him for breaking barriers and inspiring other African music artists.

== Discography ==
Studio albums

- Rave & Roses (2022)
- Heis (2024)

==== Extended plays ====
- Rema (2019)
- Freestyle (2019)
- Bad Commando (2019)
- Ravage (2023)
- E-Mortal Boy (2026)

==== Compilations ====
- Rema Compilation (2020)

== Tours ==
Headlining

- Rave & Roses World Tour (2022)
- Heis World Tour (2025)
