= Jonzing World =

Record label in Nigeria

- Industry: Music; entertainment
- Genre: Various
- Founded: 22 March 2019; 7 years ago
- Founder: D'Prince
- Headquarters: 1, Kaplan Estate, Tom Ogboi Way, Lekki Phase 1, Lagos, Nigeria
- Area served: Worldwide
- Key people: Charles Enebeli (CEO.)
- Services: Music publishing, Music distribution, Music recording, Talent Management, Merchandising, Audiovisual content, Branding, Music production, Marketing
- Parent: Jonzing World Entertainment
- Divisions: Jonzing World Publishing; Jonzing World Production; Jonzing World Management
- Website: www.jonzingworld.com

Jonzing World is a Nigerian record label and management company that was founded by a recording artist D'Prince on 22 March 2019. Jonzing World operates as a subsidiary of Jonzing World Entertainment. Other arms of the company include Jonzing World Publishing, Jonzing World Production, and Jonzing World Management. Jonzing services include music recording, music production, Music marketing, merchandising, audiovisual content, branding, management, and music distribution.

The label currently houses artists like Rema, Gdzilla, Glorious, and Bagetti. Artists formerly signed to the label include Ruger.

== History ==
On 22 March 2019, Charles Enebeli D'Prince founded Jonzing World and unveiled Rema as its first signee. Shortly after the announcement, Don Jazzy welcomed Rema to Mavin Global, a unit of Mavin Records. Same day, Rema released his eponymous debut extended play Rema, which peaked at number 1 on Apple Music Nigeria. On 19 January 2021, the label signed Ruger, through Sony Music West Africa with joint venture with Columbia Records, and Sony Music, with no affiliation with Mavin Records unit Mavin Global, says D'Prince. On 5 March 2021, Jonzing World debut Ruger extended play Pandemic.

On 30 August 2023, D'Prince unveiled and added Gdzilla to its artist roster. On 9 February 2024, D'Prince signed Glorious to Jonzing World. On 4 March 2024, D'Prince signed Bagetti to Jonzing World.

== Artists ==
=== Current acts ===
Act	Year signed	Releases under the label
D'Prince	Founder	2
Rema	2018	23
Gdzilla	2023	1
Glorious	2024	0
Bagetti	2024	1

=== Former acts ===
Act	Year signed	Year left	Releases under the label
Ruger	2021	2024	3
