= Won Da Mo =

2022 single by the Mavins

Single by Mavins featuring Rema, Ladipoe, Crayon, Bayanni, Boy Spyce, Magixx, Ayra Starr, and Johnny Drille

from the album Chapter X
- Released: 9 November 2022
- Genre: Afrobeats; rock
- Length: 4:07
- Label: Mavin
- Songwriters: Divine Ikubor; Ladipo Eso; Charles Chukwu; Abimbola Oladokun; Ugbekile Osemeke; Alexander Abelabu; Oyinkansola Aderibigbe; Oluwadamilare Aderibigbe; John Ighodaro; Prince Omoferi
- Producers: Andre Vibez; Prestige; Johnny Drille

Mavins singles chronology
"Overloading (Overdose)" (2022)	"Won Da Mo" (2022)	"Like" (2024)

Music video
- "Won Da Mo" on YouTube

"Won Da Mo" is a song recorded by Mavin Records signees, who are commonly known as the Mavins. Released on 9 November 2022, the track serves as the second single from the label's compilation album Chapter X (2022). "Won Da Mo" features vocals from artists such as Rema, Ladipoe, Crayon, Bayanni, Boy Spyce, Magixx, Ayra Starr and Johnny Drille. It was produced by Andre Vibez, with additional production from Prestige and Johnny Drille.

== Background ==
The song was meant to be released on 4 November 2022, but was postponed to mourn the passing of Davido's son Ifeanyi Adeleke.

== Critical reception ==
Yinoluwa Olowofoyeku of Afrocritik, in a review of Chapter X, said the song was "rife with the kind of infectious energy that was the signature of Don Jazzy's production style." He specifically commended Rema, Magixx, and Ayra Starr for their work on the track, and praised its "pulsing kick drums, numerous rolls and flourishes," as well as the "weeping" strings and "angelic" pads. Writers for The Native magazine shared varied perspectives on "Won Da Mo." Uzoma acknowledged Andre Vibez's "astute fusion of sounds" on the track, blending elements of rock and amapiano, although noting that the song was not a personal favorite due to its complexity. Daniel praised the production for its combination of rock guitars and rhythmic percussions, describing it as "perfection" even before the vocals began. While "Amina" was Wonu's standout production on the project, she highlighted how Vibez's work on the record seamlessly brought together kicks and snares to create a melodic cohesion.

== Commercial performance ==
"Won Da Mo" was the lead single off the Mavins' second compilation album, Chapter X, and experienced notable success on the TurnTable Official Nigeria Top 100 chart. The song debuted at No. 54 and quickly gained traction, leaping 47 spots to No. 7 in its second week. This marked a significant milestone for the all-star collaboration, as it joined the ranks of other high-performing tracks like Kizz Daniel's "Cough (Odo)" at No. 2 and Tiwa Savage and Asake's "Loaded" at No. 3. By its third week, "Won Da Mo" climbed to a new peak of No. 4, with 2.04 million streams and 48.9 million in radio reach, fueled by the impending release of Chapter X. The song later ascended to No. 1 on the chart, where it held the top spot for one week, showcasing its wide appeal and solidifying its success as a standout release from the compilation album.

== Music video ==
The music video for "Won Da Mo" was released on 2 December 2022. It was directed by Earthboi.

== Credits and personnel ==
Credits adapted from Chapter X's liner notes.

- Divine Ikubor — vocals, songwriting
- Ladipo Eso — vocals, songwriting
- Charles Chukwu — vocals, songwriting
- Abimbola Oladokun — vocals, songwriting
- Ugbekile Osemeke — vocals, songwriting
- Alexander Abelabu — vocals, songwriting
- Oyinkansola Aderibigbe — vocals, songwriting
- Oluwadamilare Aderibigbe — songwriting
- John Ighodaro — vocals, songwriting, additional production, mixing, mastering
- Prince Omoferi — songwriting
- Andre Vibez — production, mixing
- Prestige — additional production
- Mixgod - mixing, engineering
- Jones Jacob Longden - additional mixing

== Charts ==
=== Weekly charts ===
Chart performance for "Won Da Mo"
Chart (2022)	Peak position
Nigeria (TurnTable)	1
UK Afrobeats (Official Charts)	9

=== Year-end charts ===
2023 year-end chart performance for "Won Da Mo"
Chart (2023)	Position
End of the Year Top 100 of 2023 (TurnTable)	20

== Certifications ==
Certifications for Won Da Mo
Region	Certification	Certified units/sales
Nigeria (TCSN)	Platinum	100,000^{‡}
^{‡} Sales+streaming figures based on certification alone.
