= Chapter X (album) =

Compilation album by Mavin Records
- Released: 2 December 2022
- Genre: Afrobeats
- Length: 36:00
- Label: Mavin
- Producer: Sevn; Jvxn; Andre Vibez; Johnny Drille; Don Jazzy; Prestige

Mavin Records chronology
Solar Plexus (2012)	Chapter X (2022)

Singles from Chapter X
- 1. "Overloading" Released: 13 May 2022; 2. "Won Da Mo" Released: 9 November 2022

Chapter X is the second compilation album released by Mavin Records on 2 December 2022. It was jointly recorded by Don Jazzy, Rema, Ayra Starr, Crayon, Ladipoe, Magixx, Boy Spyce, Bayanni, Johnny Drille, and DJ Big N. The album was produced by Sevn, Jvxn, Andre Vibez, Johnny Drille, Don Jazzy, and Prestige. It was supported by the singles "Overloading", and "Won Da Mo". Chapter X received positive reception from music critics.

== Background ==
The label revealed the track list for the album on 30 November 2022 via social media. The album housed two singles. The lead single "Overloading" was released on 13 May 2022, is performed by Crayon, Ayra Starr, Ladipoe, Magixx and Boy Spyce, and was produced by Don Jazzy. The music video was declared the most trending Nigerian YouTube video of 2022 by Taiwo Kola-Ogunlade, Google's Communications Manager in West Africa.

The second single "Won Da Mo" was released on 9 November 2022 and is performed by Rema, Ladipoe, Crayon, Bayanni, Boy Spyce, Magixx, Ayra Starr and Johnny Drille. The song was produced by Andre Vibez. The song was meant to be released on 4 November, but was postponed due to events happening at that time, which was declared in a post by the label: "Mavin All Stars' Won Da Mo release date has now been moved to Wednesday 9th, November. The road still leads to the dynasty!!!".

== Critical reception ==
The album was generally favored by critics. The Native magazine's team praised Chapter X, highlighting its strong showcase of Mavin Records' talent. Emmanuel called it "a virtuosic skill" with "excellent replay value", while Wonu said the album "solidified the empire Mavin Records is building". Andre Vibez's production on "Amina" and "Won Da Mo" was particularly noted, with Uzoma describing the production as "solid". Overall, they view Chapter X as a well-crafted, high-energy project that exemplifies Mavin's lasting influence in Afrobeats. Bomi Anifowose of The Upper Entertainment praised Chapter X as a testament to the label's commitment to quality sound and a fitting celebration of their ten-year anniversary. He highlights the impressive lineup of artists like Rema, Johnny Drille, Ayra Starr, Ladipoe, and others, noting that expectations were high for the album. Anifowose described the project as "a hippy album, a giddy feel collection" that showcases the label's songwriting and musicianship, particularly in tracks like "Alle", "Amina", and "Ogini Na Fio". He saw Chapter X as a "proper thank you gift" to fans, urging them to "go listen and enjoy".

Yinoluwa Olowofoyeku of Afrocritik praised Chapter X for its ability to highlight the diverse talents of the Mavin All-Stars, stating that while the album "avoids the pitfall of sounding too samey", it could benefit from greater variation. He noted that Rema and Ayra Starr shine as the flag bearers of this generation, but other artists like Magixx and Boy Spyce also show promise. However, Olowofoyeku felt that "Ladipoe was a bit overused", which slightly undermined his impact on the album.

== Track listing ==
Chapter X track listing
No.	Title	Writer(s)	Producer(s)	Length
1.	"Alle" (Rema, Ladipoe, Crayon, Bayanni, Boy Spyce, Magixx, Ayra Starr)	Divine Ikubor; Ladipo Eso; Charles Chukwu; Abimbola Oladokun; Ugbekile Osemeke; Alexander Adelabu; Oyinkansola Aderibigbe; John Ighodaro	Sevn; Johnny Drille^{[a]}	3:47
2.	"All I'm Saying" (Crayon, Johnny Drille, Don Jazzy, Bayanni, Boy Spyce, Ladipoe)	Chukwu; Prince Omoferi; Michael Ajereh; Oladokun; Osemeke; Eso	Sevn	3:56
3.	"Ogini Na Fio" (Crayon, Don Jazzy, Ladipoe)	Omoferi; Chukwu; Ajereh; Eso	Jvxn	3:23
4.	"Won Da Mo" (Rema, Ladipoe, Crayon, Bayanni, Boy Spyce, Magixx, Ayra Starr, Johnny Drille)	Ikubor; Eso; Chukwu; Oladokun; Osemeke; Abelabu; Aderibigbe; Oluwadamilare Aderibigbe	Andre Vibez; Prestige^{[a]}; Johnny Drille^{[a]}	4:07
5.	"Amina" (Rema, Ayra Starr, Bayanni, Crayon, DJ Big N)	Ikubor; Aderibigbe; Oladokun; Chukwu; Nonso Ajufo; Aderibigbe	Andre Vibez	3:41
6.	"Overloading" (Crayon, Ayra Starr, Ladipoe, Magixx, Boy Spyce)	Aderibigbe; Eso; Abelabu; Osemeke; Omoferi; Aderibigbe; Treasure Apiafi Banigo	Don Jazzy	3:25
7.	"Losing You" (Johnny Drille, Crayon, Magixx)	Ighodaro; Chukwu; Abelabu; Omoferi	Andre Vibez	3:30
8.	"Won Le Le" (Ladipoe, Magixx, Crayon, Bayanni, Rema, Boy Spyce)	Eso; Abelabu; Chukwu; Oladokun; Ikubor; Osemeke	Prestige	4:07
9.	"Jara" (Bayanni, Don Jazzy, Magixx, DJ Big N)	Oladokun; Ajereh; Abelabu; Ajufo	Andre Vibez	3:13
10.	"You" (Boy Spyce, Johnny Drille, Don Jazzy, Magixx, Ladipoe)	Osemeke; Ighodaro; Aderibigbe; Ajereh; Abelabu; Eso; Omoferi	Jvxn	3:33
Total length:				36:00

Notes

- ^{^[a]} signifies an additional producer.

== Personnel ==
- Rema – vocals, writer
- Ladipoe – vocals, writer
- Crayon – vocals, writer
- Bayanni – vocals, writer
- Boy Spyce – vocals, writer
- Magixx – vocals, writer
- Ayra Starr – vocals, writer
- Johnny Drille – vocals, writer, producer, additional production, mixing, mastering
- Sevn – producer
- Mixgod – mixing, recording engineer
- DJ Swivel – additional mixing
- Jvxn – producer
- Andre Vibez – producer, mixing
- Prestige – additional production
- Oluwadamilare Aderibigbe – writer
- Prince Omoferi – writer
- DJ Big N – writer
- Don Jazzy – producer, writer, executive producer
- Kashthemyth – recording engineer
- Jones Jacob Longden – additional mixing
- Lifesize Teddy – writer

== Release history ==
Release history and formats for Chapter X
Region	Date	Format	Label
Various	2 December 2022	Streaming; Digital download	Mavin
