= Before We Fall Asleep =

Studio album by Johnny Drille
- Released: 3 September 2021
- Recorded: 2021
- Studio: Mavin Studios
- Genre: Pop; R&B; alté; rock; country
- Length: 43:25
- Label: Mavin
- Producer: Johnny Drille; Wilson Muzik; London; Altims; Fink

Johnny Drille chronology
Before We Fall Asleep (2021)	Home (2022)

Singles from Before We Fall Asleep
- 1. "loving is harder" Released: August 26, 2021

Before We Fall Asleep is the debut studio album by Nigerian singer-songwriter Johnny Drille. It was released on 3 September 2021, through Mavin Records. Self produced by Johnny Drille with additional productions from Wilson Muzik, London, Altims, and Fink. The album was exclusively produced by Don Jazzy with A&R direction from Rima Tahini. The album features Don Jazzy, Styl-Plus, Ladipoe, Ayra Starr, Chylde, Lagos Community Choir, Cillsoul, Kwittee, with co-writers including Ayra brother credited as Milar, and Cill Soul.

== Awards and nominations ==
Award	Year	Category	Result	Ref.
African Entertainment Awards USA	2021	Album of the Year	Nominated	

== Track listing ==
Credits adapted from Tidal and Apple Music where applicable.

Before We Fall Asleep track listing
No.	Title	Writer(s)	Producer(s)	Length
1.	"MY KIND OF BROWN"	John Ighodaro	Johnny Drille	3:41
2.	"loving is harder"	Ighodaro; Tega Oghenejobo; Wilson Okafor	Wilson Muzic	2:29
3.	"ludo"	Ighodaro; Chioma Ogbonna	Johnny Drille	2:42
4.	"ova" (featuring Don Jazzy)	Prince Omoferi; Ighodaro; Michael Ajereh	Johnny Drille	3:23
5.	"odo" (featuring Styl-Plus)	Ighodaro	Johnny Drille	2:33
6.	"driving in the rain" (featuring LADIPOE)	Ighodaro; Ladipo Eso; Oluwadamilare Aderibigbe; Ogbonna	Johnny Drille	2:46
7.	"BEFORE I LET GO"	Ighodaro; Rima Tahini; Oluwadamilare Aderibigbe; Ogbonna	Johnny Drille	2:36
8.	"in the light" (featuring Ayra Starr)	Ighodaro; Oyinkansola Sarah Aderibigbe; Oluwadamilare Aderibigbe; Michael Hunter	London	3:26
9.	"CLOCKS" (featuring Chylde)	Ighodaro; Eniola Isioma Hashim; Oluwadamilare Aderibigbe	Johnny Drille	2:58
10.	"LIES (To Whom it May Concern)"	Ighodaro; Oluwadamilare Aderibigbe; Cheun	Johnny Drille	3:23
11.	"lost in the rhythm"	Ighodaro; Oluwadamilare Aderibigbe; Timothy Aluku	Burssbrain	2:15
12.	"SWEET AS A MOTHER'S LOVE"	Fin Greenall; Lamont Dozier	Fink	3:17
13.	"SISTER" (featuring Kwittee, Lagos Community Gospel Choir, and Cill)	Ighodaro; Ogbonna; Douglas Jekan	Johnny Drille	4:16
14.	"sell my soul"	Ighodaro; Oluwadamilare Aderibigbe	Johnny Drille	3:40
Total length:				43:25

== Personnel ==
Credits for Before We Fall Asleep

Performance

- Johnny Drille - vocals
- David Dajuma - additional vocals (2, 10)
- Cill - background vocals (3, 6, 7, 8, 12, 13)
- Isaac Edberamen - voiceover (11)
- Massive Matthew - voiceover (11)
- Mary Colette - voiceover (7)

Musicians

- Kwittee - Trumpet (2, 13, 14)
- Nsikak David - additional guitars (4, 6, 14)
- Ufot 'Godwyn' Godwin - acoustic guitar (7), electric guitar (7)
- Femi Leye - electric guitar (7)
- David Rhino - electric guitar (10)
- Isonil - violin (13)
- Wilson Muzic - piano (12)
- Johnny Drille - bass (12)
- Frank Ohikhuare - vocal conductor / arranger for lagos community gospel choir (13)

Technical

- Johnny Drille - mixing (all tracks), mastering (all tracks)

Design

- Adeolu Osibodu - album photography
- Afolabi Olalekan - design
