= Bayanni =

Nigerian singer and songwriter (born 1997)

- Born: Oladokun Abimbola Elijah; 25 June 1997 (age 29); Lagos, Nigeria
- Genres: Afro-fusion, afro-pop
- Occupations: Singer; songwriter
- Instrument: Vocals
- Label: Mavin Records

Oladokun Abimbola Elijah (born 25 June 1997), known professionally as Bayanni, is a Nigerian singer-songwriter signed to Mavin Records He rose to prominence with the release of the song “Ta Ta Ta”, which peaked at number 13 on the Billboard U.S. Afrobeats Songs, peaked at number 68 on TurnTable Top 50 single chart and earned him his first ever IFPI Denmark Gold Certification. The remix featured American singer and songwriter Jason Derulo.

== Early life and education ==
Bayanni was born Oladokun Abimbola Elijah in Alagbado, a town situated on the border between Lagos State and Ogun State in Nigeria. Bayanni began his early education at The Bells International School in Lagos, where he attended kindergarten and primary school from 1999 to 2005. He proceeded to Grace and Glory International School for his secondary education, completing it between 2006 and 2011. In 2012, he enrolled in a pre-degree program at Obafemi Awolowo University, and subsequently pursued a degree at the same institution from 2014 to 2019. He is the third of five sons. Born to a university bursar and a school teacher. During his upbringing, Bayanni and his brothers were encouraged to play musical instruments in their local church as a way to stay engaged and disciplined. This early exposure to music played a significant role in sparking his interest in the craft. He has cited his childhood experiences as a formative influence on his musical journey.

== Career ==
On August 2022, Bayanni was signed to Mavin Records after he underwent training at the Mavin Academy, the label’s artist development program, with a self-titled EP "Bayanni". In 2022, he gained widespread recognition with the release of "Ta Ta Ta," which became one of the notable crossover songs of 2022 earning him The Headies nomination for Rookie of the Year and winning first international award at the Urban Music Awards for Best Viral Breakthrough Song. On 31 January 2023, Spotify cited him as one of the emerging artists to look out for from Nigeria, alongside Khaid. "Ta Ta Ta" peaked at number 68 on the Nigeria TurnTable chart. Bayanni was also ranked number 1 on TurnTable's NXT Emerging Top Artistes The Challenge also went viral on TikTok and "Ta Ta Ta" was one of the most recognisable phrases across TikTok with over 4.2 Million UGC, it was named one of the best Afrobeats Songs at the moment by OkayAfrica. On 19 July 2024, he released "Finish Me (AEIOU)" which debuted at number 82 TurnTable chart. On 30 August 2024, Bayanni released the single "Goddess" featuring Nigerian artist Ruger. The song was later included in Deezer’s list of the best Afrobeats songs of 2024, the song also debuted at number 88 TurnTable chart. On 29 November 2024, Bayanni released the single "For Where" featuring Nigerian artist Zerrydl. The track achieved moderate commercial traction, debuting at number 59 on the Spotify Nigeria Daily Chart and peaking at number 37 on the Apple Music Nigeria Top 100 chart, it also peaked at number 19 on TurnTable chart.

== Discography ==
=== EPs ===
- Bayanni (2022)
- Love & Hustle (2025)

=== Selected singles ===
As lead artist
Year	Title	Album
2022	"Ta Ta Ta"	Bayanni
2023	"Ta Ta Ta (Remix) (with Jason Derulo)	Non-album single
2023	”Low Waist”	
2024	”Finish Me (AEIOU)”	Non-album single
2024	"Goddess" (with Ruger)	Non-album single
2024	"For Where" (with Zerrydl)	Non-album single
2024	"Casanova"	Non-album single
2025	"Namipa"(with Qing Madi)	Non-album single
2025	"Princess Treatment"	Non-album single
2025	"Hustlers Anthem"(with Don Jazzy)	Non-album single
As featured artist
Year	Title	Album
2022	Won Da Mo (Mavins, Rema & Boy Spyce feat. Crayon, Bayanni, Magixx, Ladipoe, Ayra Starr & Johnny Drille)	Chapter X
2022	Alle (Mavins, Rema & Ladipoe feat. Bayanni, Crayon, Boy Spyce, Magixx & Ayra Starr)	Chapter X
2022	Amina (Mavins, Rema & Ayra Starr feat. Bayanni & Crayon)	Chapter X
2022	Won Le Le (Mavins, Ladipoe & Magixx feat. Crayon, Bayanni, Rema & Boy Spyce)	Chapter X
2022	All I’m Saying (Mavins, Crayon & Johnny Drille feat. Don Jazzy, Bayanni, Boy Spyce & Ladipoe)	Chapter X
2023	Goal Keeper (Basketmouth feat. Shatta Wale & Bayanni)	Uburu
2023	Dondosa (Bensoul feat. Bayanni)	Non-album single
2023	Chocola (Mohombi feat. Bayanni & Dawda)	Non-album single
2023	I Go Dey There (Ric Hassani feat. Bayanni)	Non-album single
2023	Feeling Good (Guchi feat. Bayanni)	Non-album single
2024	Forever (DJ Neptune feat. Bayanni & Bruce Melodie)	Uburu
2024	Nippi Nappe Ye (Al Wasser feat. Snoop Dogg & Bayanni)	Non-album single
2025	Adiza (DJ Ruckus feat. Bayanni & Jnr Choi)	Non-album single
2025	Bukhaar (Aroob Khan feat. Bayanni)	Non-album single

=== Film ===
Year	Song	Film	Composer(s)	Co-singer(s)	Lyrics	Label
2026	"Vallah"	Cocktail 2	Pritam	Harrdy Sandhu	Amitabh Bhattacharya	Universal Music India

== Awards and nominations ==
Year	Ceremony	Award	Nominated work	Result	Ref
2023	The Headies	Rookie of the Year	Himself	Nominated	
2023	The Urban Music Awards (UMAs)	Best Viral Breakthrough Song	"Ta Ta Ta"	Won	
2024	Africa Arts Entertainment Awards	Best Hit West Africa	Bayanni & Ruger's "Goddess"	Won	
