= Do Like That =

Single by Korede Bello

from the album Belloved
- Written: 2014
- Released: 13 September 2016
- Recorded: 2016
- Genre: Afropop
- Length: 3:33
- Label: Mavin
- Songwriter: Korede Bello
- Producer: Altims

Korede Bello singles chronology
| "Flawless" (2016) | "Do Like That" (2016) | "Do Like That" (remix) (2017) |

Kelly Rowland singles chronology
| "I Know What You Did Last Summer" (2015) | "Do Like That" (remix) (2017) | "Get It" (2018) |

Music video
- "Do Like That" on YouTube

"Do Like That" is a song by Nigerian singer Korede Bello. The Altims-produced single was released through Mavin Records on 13 September 2016, and was included as a bonus track from his debut studio album Belloved (2017). The official remix to "Do Like That" was released on 22 February 2017 and features American R&B singer Kelly Rowland. Korede Bello told HipTV that Rowland was the one who reached out to him to be on the song. On 20 September 2021, "Do Like That" was certified gold in the United States, while it was certified gold in Canada on 21 June 2022.

== Background ==
Korede Bello shared how "Do Like That" was made in an interview with Premium Times. He said he first thought of the idea and melody for the song on a flight to Dubai for Tiwa Savage's wedding in 2014. He saved the melody on his phone and worked on it during the trip, then left it there. Two years later, he found the voice note, reached out to producer Altims in the early morning, and they recorded the track.

== Composition and lyrics ==
"Do Like That" is a blend of Afrobeat and pop that sees Korede Bello singing over an upbeat, rhythmic instrumental. The song departs from the style of his earlier hit "Godwin", and leans for a more dance-oriented sound with catchy hooks and a lively tempo. Its lyrics focus on attraction as he calls out to a love interest. The drums and synths drive the track and support its light, flirty mood. Joey Akan said the song showed Korede Bello finally applying his versatility in a way that worked, calling it "a club single, with catchy phrases, witty lines, and an abundance of humor," and noting that "this time it works." The Fader described it as a "slinky, seductive Afropop anthem, soaked in AutoTune in synth sax."

== Music video ==
The music video for "Do Like That" was released on 23 November 2016. It was shot in London by UK-based video director Konstantin. In the video, Bello arrives at a party, spots a woman, and ends up dancing with her.

== Certifications ==
Certifications for "Do Like That"
| Region | Certification | Certified units/sales |
|---|---|---|
| Canada (Music Canada) | Gold | 40,000^{‡} |
| United States (RIAA) | Gold | 500,000^{‡} |
^{‡} Sales+streaming figures based on certification alone.
