= Andre Vibez =

Nigerian music producer (born 1988)

- Born: Alexander Uwaifo; 25 September 1988 (age 37)
- Origin: Nigerian
- Genres: Afrobeats, Afropop
- Occupation: Record producer
- Years active: 2012–present
- Label: Mavin Records

Alexander Uwaifo (born 25 September 1988) known professionally as Andre Vibez, is a Nigerian music producer and songwriter. He is best known for producing "Rush" from Ayra Starr's album 19 & Dangerous and Rema international hit single "Calm Down" which peaked at number one on the India IMI International chart and also peak no.3 on Billboard Hot 100 after its remix with Selena Gomez. In September 2022, he was announced as one of the newly signed record producers of the Nigerian record label, Mavin Records.

== Early life ==
Vibez was born on 25 September 1988 and grew up in the south-south region of Nigeria, Benin City, Edo State. He attended Kings College, Lagos where he completed his secondary education, and later on he obtained a Bachelor's Degree in Fine and Applied Arts from the University of Benin, Nigeria. Vibez's musical career started when he was a teenager in the year 2005. He grew up as a part of his father, Victor Uwaifo's music band "Titibiti".

== Career ==
Vibez's father, Sir Victor Uwaifo was a Nigerian highlife musician well known for winning the first gold disc in Africa. Vibez started producing music in 2005 and worked alongside his father as a keyboardist. His music production career officially started in 2012, with the song titled "Selensele" by Leroy.

In 2021, Vibez produced the song "Feeling" by Ladipoe and Bnxn. That same year, he served as the producer for the hit single "Calm Down" alongside fellow Nigerian record producer, London. In October 2022, he was signed to Mavin Records, a Nigerian record label founded by Don Jazzy. In November 2022, he produced the Mavin Records All-stars single "Won Da Mo" featuring Rema, Ayra Starr, Magixx, Ladipoe, Crayon, Johnny Drille, Boy Spyce, Bayanni, and Don Jazzy. He also worked as the producer for "Calm Down Remix" by Rema featuring Selena Gomez .

== Production discography ==
Year	Title	Artiste	Notes
2015	"Unbeatable"	New Dawn (ft. Mo'Fame, One Touch, Mr Joejo, Steven Tones, John NetworQ, Duno & KOD)	
2016	"No Lele"	Steven Tones	
2020	"Ye ye ye"	Omah Lay	
2021	"Calm Down"	Rema	
2021	"Running"	Ladipoe ft Fireboy	
2021	"Feeling"	Ladipoe ft Buju	
2021	"Man Dem"	Crayon ft One Acen	
2021	"Too Correct"	Crayon ft Rema	
2022	"Rush"	Ayra Starr	
2022	"Destiny"	Boy Spyce	
2022	"Mara"	Rema	
2022	"Bridgertn"	Ayra Starr	
2022	"Won Da Mo"	Marvin Records(ft Rema, Ayra Starr, Magixx, Ladipoe, Crayon, Johnny Drille, Boy Spyce, Bayanni, and Don Jazzy)	
2022	"Losing You"	Mavins, Johnny Drille & Magixx ft Crayon	
2023	"How Many Times"	DJ Big N (ft Ayra Starr & Oxlade)	
2023	"Calm Down Remix"	Rema ft Selena Gomez	
2023	"Chop Time, No Friend"	Mr. Eazi	
2023	"Modupe"	Crayon	
2023	"Calvary Kid"	Crayon	
2023	"Hypnotic"	Lifesize Teddy	
2023	"Butterflies"	Lifesize Teddy	
2025	"With you"	Magixx	
2025	"Sexy Lady"	Magixx	

== Awards ==
Year	Award	Category	Result	Ref
2021	The Beatz Award	New Discovery Producer of the Year	Won	
2022	The Beatz Award	Producer of the Year	Nominated	
2022	The Beatz Award	Afro-pop producer of the Year	Nominated	
	The Beatz Award	Afro hip-hop producer of the Year	Won	
2023	The Headies	Producer of the Year	Nominated	
2023	AFRIMMA	Music producer of the Year	Nominated	
2023	MVP Soundcity Awards	African producer of the Year	Nominated	
