= Chapter Ten =

Chapter Ten, Chapter 10, or Chapter X may refer to:

== Music ==
- Chapter 10, a 2013 album by Filipino singer and television personality Jake Zyrus (formerly known as Charice)
- "Chapter 10", the tenth song from Matthew Shipp's 2015 album The Gospel According to Matthew & Michael
- "Chapter Ten" (Kendrick Lamar song), the tenth song from Kendrick Lamar's 2011 debut studio album Section.80
- Chapter X (album), a 2022 Mavins album

== Television ==
- "Chapter 10" (American Horror Story)
- "Chapter 10" (Eastbound & Down)
- "Chapter 10" (House of Cards)
- "Chapter 10" (Legion)
- "Chapter 10" (Star Wars: Clone Wars), an episode of Star Wars: Clone Wars
- "Chapter 10: The Passenger", an episode of The Mandalorian
- "Chapter Ten" (Boston Public)
- "Chapter Ten: Gloria", an episode of Katy Keene
- "Chapter Ten: The Lost Weekend", an episode of Riverdale
- "Chapter Ten: The Witching Hour", an episode of Chilling Adventures of Sabrina

== Other uses ==
- Chapter X of the United Nations Charter
