= Spotlight (Reekado Banks album) =

Studio album by Reekado Banks
- Released: 1 September 2016
- Length: 69:01
- Label: Mavin
- Producer: Don Jazzy; Altims; Babyfresh

Reekado Banks chronology
Spotlight (2016)	Off the Record (2020)

Singles from Spotlight
- 1. "Katapot" Released: 13 February 2015; 2. "Standard" Released: 6 June 2016

Spotlight is the debut studio album by Nigerian singer Reekado Banks. Released through Mavin Records on 1 September 2016, the album features guest appearances from Patoranking, Falz, D'Prince, Vanessa Mdee, Kenny Blaq, and Sarkodie. Its production was handled by Don Jazzy, Altims, and Babyfresh. Spotlight reached number 10 on the Billboard World Albums chart, and received a nomination for Album of the Year at the 2017 Ghana-Naija Showbiz Awards. The album did not spawn any singles of its own; however, previously released singles "Katapot" and "Standard" appear as bonus tracks.

== Background ==
Sometime in 2014, Reekado Banks's older brother, Temi Solomon, submitted some of his songs to Mavin Records as part of an online talent search, doing so without Reekado's knowledge. Out of over 5,000 submissions, his entries were selected, leading to his signing with the label.

== Promotion ==
Don Jazzy promoted the album with his announcement on Twitter, tweeting "Reekado album loading… 2016" with the hashtags #AlbumWeyGoBurstBrain and #Reeky2016.

== Singles ==
Spotlight was housed by two singles which were released prior to the album as standalone tracks and later added as bonus tracks. The first single, "Katapot", was released on 13 February 2015. Produced by Don Jazzy, it was misconceived by listeners as a diss track aimed at Don Jazzy's former Mo' Hits collaborators, D'banj and Wande Coal, due to its lyrics addressing envy and jealousy. Don Jazzy denied the allegations via Twitter, stating that he does not create diss tracks. The song's music video won Best Use of Visual Effect in a Video at the 2015 Nigerian Music Video Awards. The second single "Standard" was released on 6 June 2016. It was produced by Altims.

== Critical reception ==
Professional ratings
Review scores
Source	Rating
tooXclusive	3.5/5 stars
Pulse Nigeria	3.5/5 stars
Filterfree	63%

Joey Akan of Pulse Nigeria described Spotlight as a "masterpiece" that combines personal storytelling with club-ready hits, showcasing his versatility in Afro-Caribbean, dancehall, and Afrobeat-inspired sounds. He concluded, "If any talent deserves to benefit from the business and affectionate nurturing of Don Jazzy, it’s surely Reekado Banks," and rated the album 3.5/5. Wilfred Okiche of 360nobs described the album as a mixed bag, with 21 tracks that lacked focus and leaned too heavily on repetitive sounds and influences. While Reekado Banks showcased his versatility, the album failed to deliver a cohesive identity, with Okiche concluding that "Don Jazzy will always be fine but he doesn’t do this particular ‘child’ many favours here."

Kvng Michael of tooXclusive described Spotlight as a decent effort with top-notch production but noted that its arrangement could have been better. He concluded, "All in all, it was a commendable effort from the 'Katapot' crooner," and rated the album 3.5/5. Chiagoziem Onyekwena of Filterfree praised Spotlight as a debut showcasing Reekado Banks' versatility and personal storytelling, though he noted the album's lack of cohesion due to its many musical styles. Concluding that "Reekado Banks had a lot to say about his short time in the Spotlight and just enough musical pep in his step to make you want to listen to it again and again," the album was rated 63%.

== Track listing ==
Spotlight track listing
No.	Title	Writer(s)	Producer(s)	Length
1.	"Hey Stranger"	Ayoleyi Solomon	Altims	3:29
2.	"Killah Whyna" (featuring Patoranking)	Solomon; Patrick Okorie	Babyfresh	3:17
3.	"Problem"	Solomon	Babyfresh	3:05
4.	"Koloba"	Solomon	Altims	2:24
5.	"Biggy Man" (featuring Falz)	Solomon; Folarin Falana	Babyfresh	3:22
6.	"Ladies and Gentlemen"	Solomon	Altims	2:57
7.	"Baby Oku"	Solomon	Altims	3:21
8.	"All Your Love" (featuring D'Prince)	Solomon; Charles Enebeli	Babyfresh	3:06
9.	"Change"	Solomon	Don Jazzy	3:05
10.	"Skit" (featuring Kenny Blaq)		—	2:02
11.	"Move" (featuring Vanessa Mdee)	Solomon; Vanessa Mdee	Altims	3:49
12.	"Gbagbe"	Solomon	Altims	2:48
13.	"Love My Baby"	Solomon	Don Jazzy	3:26
14.	"Na Ur Boy"	Solomon; Cupa Stonce	Don Jazzy	3:48
15.	"Olaoluwa"	Solomon	Don Jazzy	3:41
16.	"Today"	Solomon	Babyfresh	3:26
17.	"Dangote"	Solomon	Babyfresh	3:20
18.	"Turn the Lights On"	Solomon	Don Jazzy	4:16

Bonus tracks
No.	Title	Writer(s)	Producer(s)	Length
19.	"Katapot"	Solomon	Don Jazzy	4:00
20.	"Oluwa Ni" (remix; featuring Sarkodie)	Solomon; Michael Addo	Altims	3:30
21.	"Standard"	Solomon	Altims	2:49
Total length:				69:01

== Personnel ==
Credits adapted from back cover.

- Altims — production (tracks 1, 4, 6, 7, 11, 12, 10, 21), mixing and mastering (tracks 1–3, 5–7, 9–15, 17–21)
- Babyfresh — production (tracks 2, 3, 5, 8, 16, 17)
- Don Jazzy — production (tracks 9, 13, 14, 15, 18, 19), executive producer
- Femi Leye - guitar (track 6)
- Peter Ajani — sax (track 16)
- Suka Sounds — mixing and mastering (tracks 4, 8, 16)
- Obi Somto - photography
- Clintivity Becreative - design

== Release history ==
Release history and formats for Spotlight
Region	Date	Format	Label
Various	1 September 2016	CD; digital download	Mavin
