= DJ Big N =

Nigerian DJ and producer

- Born: Nonso Temisan Ajufo; Lagos State, Nigeria
- Genres: House, hip hop, R&B, Afrobeats
- Occupation: DJ
- Instrument: Mixer
- Years active: 2007–present
- Label: Mavin Records
- Website: mavinrecords.com

Nonso Temisan Ajufo known professionally as DJ Big N is a Nigerian DJ. As part of Mavin Records, DJ Big N has supported several of the label's top-billed acts, including supporting Tiwa Savage on her first American tour. He has released several Mavin themed mixtapes, including the "Mavin All Stars" mixtape, the ‘Surulere Mixtape Volume 1’, the "ENERGY Mixtape", and several Afro session Mixtapes with “Alternate Sound” band. DJ Big N has collaborated with several Afrobeat artists, including Burna Boy, Wizkid, and Mr. Eazi.

== Early life ==
Big N was born in Lagos State to Nigerian parents and currently lives in Lagos state, Nigeria after moving back from the United Kingdom where he went to further his studies. He obtained an MBA degree from Coventry University in England. He also holds a BSc degree in Psychology from the University of Lagos. He is the second half of a set of twins. He has a twin sister. He attended King's College Lagos and Corona School, Ikoyi.

== Career ==
DJ Big N started his career in the UK playing local clubs in the West Midlands before guest playing at the Palms Club in Coventry as well as Guest playing at Club "Release". He also played for the Nigerian independence 2009 in Coventry, where he got his big break. Dj Big N has performed alongside acts like Kool & the Gang, Maxi Priest, Dru Hill, Billy Ocean and Joe. He also was the official DJ for the Jarule and Ashanti show which held in Lagos in October 2014. In February 2014, he was appointed as Mavin records artist, Dr Sid official Disk Jockey. He later went on to become the official DJ for the Mavin UK tour.

DJ Big N became an active member of Mavin Records Dynasty in 2013 and plays as Mavin Records official DJ. He was the DJ of Rema's first America tour. After years behind turntable, he took the microphone releasing series of singles featuring star artistes including Wizkid, Burna Boy, Ayra Starr, Kizz Daniel, Tiwa Savage and Rema. In September 2014, DJ BIG N released the first ever official MAVIN Mixtape. He was the official DJ for the Nigerian Centenary event that took place in Abuja in January 2014. He released the first ever "MAVIN ALL STARS MIXTAPE".

He has worked with Mavin Records on live performances and DJ sets. In 2024, he joined The Recording Academy and won the Red Bull Spin It Loud Nigeria competition.

In February 2026, DJ Big N released the “Africa Now: February 2026 DJ Mix”, a curated set of Afrobeats and Afropop tracks on Apple Music that showcased a range of popular artists including Burna Boy, Wizkid, and Rema.

=== Shooting incident ===
In January 2025, DJ Big N survived a robbery and shooting incident in Johannesburg, South Africa. He was ambushed by armed men while in a car at a traffic light. In an attempt to escape, he was shot in the leg. He was rushed to a hospital where doctors confirmed the bullet had passed through his leg, narrowly missing a major artery and bone. Following the attack, he shared on Instagram that he lost over $114,000 worth of valuables but considered his survival a miracle and an event that changed his perspective on life.

== Discography ==
Singles
| Title | Featured artists | Year | Ref |
|---|---|---|---|
| Erima | Wizkid and Dr Sid | 2016 | |
| Gbegiri | Korede Bello, CDQ and Terry Apala | 2016 | |
| Anything | Tiwa Savage and Burna Boy | 2017 | |
| The Trilogy | Reekado Banks, Iyanya and Ycee | 2018 | |
| I'm I Love | Reekado Banks | 2018 | |
| My dear | Kizz Daniel and Don Jazzy | 2018 | |
| Jowo | Mr Eazi | 2019 | |
| Ogologoma | Rema | 2019 | |
| Ife | Don Jazzy and Teni | 2020 | |
| Aje | Remy Crown | 2021 | |
| How Many Times | Ayra Starr and Oxlade | 2023 | |

Mixtapes
| Year | Title | Ref. |
|---|---|---|
| | MAVIN ALL STARS MIXTAPE | DJ BIG N - YouTube |
| | SURULERE MIXTAPE VOLUME 1 | DJ BIG N - YouTube |
| | ENERGY ΜΙΧΤΑΡΕ | DJ BIG N - YouTube |
| 2024 | BEST OF AFROBEAT 2024 ΜΙΧΤΑΡΕ | DJ BIG N - YouTube |
| 2025 | AFROBEAT 101 ΜΙΧΤΑΡΕ | DJ BIG N - YouTube |
| 2025 | BEST OF AFROBEAT MIX SUMMER 2025 (VOL. 1) | DJ BIG N - YouTube |
| 2025 | BEST OF AFROBEAT 2025 MIXTAPE VOL 2 | DJ BIG N - YouTube |

== Awards and nominations ==
| Year | Award | Category | Result | Ref |
|---|---|---|---|---|
| 2017 | Scream Awards | Youth DJ of the Year | Won | |
| 2018 | The Beatz Awards | Male DJ Of The Year | Nominated | |
| 2019 | City People Music Awards | DJ of the Year (male) | Won | |
| 2020 | Nigerian Choice Awards | DJ of the Year | Won | |
| 2021 | Afrima Awards | Best DJ Africa | Won | |
| 2021 | The Beatz Awards | Male DJ of the Year | Nominated | |
| 2022 | Afrima Awards | Best Africa DJ | Nominated | |
| 2023 | Soundcity MVP Awards Festival | African DJ of the Year | Nominated | |

== See also ==
- List of Nigerian DJs
- List of Igbo people
