= Solar Plexus =

The celiac plexus (or solar plexus) is a complex network of nerves located in the abdomen.

Solar plexus or Solar Plexus may also refer to:

- The solar plexus chakra in Hinduism, see Manipura

== Music ==
- Solar Plexus (album), a 2012 compilation by Mavin Records
- Solar Plexus, a 2014 album by Thea Hjelmeland
- Solar Plexus, a 1972 album by the Swedish jazz-fusion-pop band Solar Plexus, with Tommy Körberg
- Volume 1: Solar Plexus, a 2011 EP by The Empire Shall Fall
- "Solar Plexus", a 1997 song by BT from ESCM
- "Solar Plexus", a 1971 album by Ian Carr with Nucleus
