= Love Don't Cost a Dime =

Single by Magixx

from the EP Magixx
- Released: 24 September 2021
- Recorded: At Mavin Studios, Lekki, Lagos, Nigeria
- Genre: R&B; alté; afropop
- Length: 3:25
- Label: Mavin
- Songwriter: Adelabu Alexander Adewunmi
- Producer: Lomon

Magixx singles chronology
"Love Don't Cost a Dime" (2021)	"Chocolate" (2022)

Music video
- "Love Don't Cost A Dime" on YouTube

"Love Don't Cost a Dime" is a song by Nigerian singer and songwriter Magixx, from his eponymous debut EP Magixx. It was officially released as a single on 24 September 2021 by Mavin Records. The song was written by Magixx, and produced by Lomon. A new version of the song titled "Love Don't Cost a Dime (Re-Up)" featuring Nigerian singer Ayra Starr was released as a single in 2022.

== Background ==
Magixx signed a recording contract and music publishing deal with Mavin Records on 23 September 2021, a day before the release of his eponymous project Magixx. "Love Don't Cost a Dime", the first track on the EP, was one of the songs he wrote. The production was handled by Lomon, at Mavin Studios in Lekki, Lagos. During an interview with Bambo Ojo, a music author for The Culture Custodian, Magixx discussed the song's creation, and said: "The song was just a vibe. It wasn’t really inspired by something that I was feeling at that moment, it was just based on past experiences." On 16 October 2021, Glitch Africa released a live performance of "Love Don't Cost a Dime".

== Reception and commercial performance ==
Music critics for The Native classified "Love Don't Cost a Dime" as having the biggest hit potential on the eponymous extended play, during their first impressions of the project. In a review for Pulse Nigeria, music critic Motolani Alake described "Love Don't Cost a Dime" as "the best song on the EP." On 25 October 2021, the song debuted at number 22 on the TurnTable Top 50 chart; it also debuted on the Turntable Top 50 Airplay chart at number 46 on 23 October 2021 and peaked at number 15, on 27 October 2021. The song debuted at number 30 on the Billboard U.S. Afrobeats Songs chart, and it was included on Culture Custodian's list of "5 songs to add to your playlist" in September 2021.

On 12 February 2022, "Love Don't Cost a Dime (Re-Up)", featuring Ayra Starr, debuted at 27 on the TurnTable Top 50 chart and peaked at number 8 on 28 March 2022. On 22 February 2022, it debuted on the Turntable Top 50 Airplay chart at number 15 and peaked at number 4, on 29 March 2022. It debuted at number 41 on the Turntable Top 50 Streaming Songs chart on 2 March 2022, and peaked at number 14 on 23 March 2022. It debuted on the Turntable Top Triller chart Nigeria at number 14 on 23 February 2022. The song debuted on the UK Afrobeats Singles Chart at number 20 on 13 March 2022. As of April 2022, "Love Don't Cost a Dime (Re-Up)" had received 4.6 million streams on Boomplay.

On 11 July 2022, it debuted on the newly launched TurnTable Top 100, an expansion of the Top 50 chart, at number 33. On 14 July 2022, following the initial launch of the Nigeria Top Afro-R&B Songs chart, "Love Don't Cost a Dime (Re-Up)" debuted at number 1. On 13 July 2022, it debuted on the newly launched TurnTable Top Streaming Songs chart, an expansion of the Top 50 Streaming Songs chart, at number 37, and debuted on the newly launched TurnTable Top Radio Songs chart, an expansion of the Top 50 Airplay chart, at number 33.

== Music video ==
The music video for "Love Don't Cost a Dime" was directed by Director K for PriorGold Pictures, and it was released on the same day as the EP. As of April 2023, it had surpassed 17 million views on YouTube.

== Versions ==
- 2021: "Love Don't Cost a Dime"
- 2022: "Love Don't Cost a Dime (Re-Up)" (with Ayra Starr) – 2:27

== Charts ==
Performance for "Love Don't Cost A Dime"
Chart (2021)	Peak position
Nigeria TurnTable Top 50 chart (TurnTable)	22
Nigeria Turntable Top 50 Airplay (TurnTable)	46
US Afrobeats Songs (Billboard)	30

Performance for "Love Don't Cost A Dime (Re-Up)"
Chart (2022)	Peak position
Nigeria TurnTable Top 100 (TurnTable)	33
Nigeria TurnTable Top 50 chart (TurnTable)	27
Nigeria Top Afro-R&B Songs (TurnTable)	1
Nigeria Turntable Top 50 Airplay (TurnTable)	15
Nigeria Top 50 Streaming Songs (TurnTable)	41
Top Triller chart Nigeria (TurnTable)	14
UK Afrobeats (OCC)	11
