= Magixx =

Magixx may refer to:

- Matrixx Magixx, Dutch basketball team
- Magixx (singer), Nigerian singer and songwriter
- magixx (gamer), Russian professional Counter-Strike 2 player Boris Vorobiev
