= Belloved =

Studio album by Korede Bello
- Released: 11 March 2017
- Length: 50:16
- Label: Mavin
- Producer: Don Jazzy (also exec.); Cobhams Asuquo; Altims; Babyfresh

Korede Bello chronology
Belloved (2017)	Table for Two (2020)

Singles from Belloved
- 1. "Godwin" Released: 28 January 2015; 2. "Romantic" Released: 10 December 2015; 3. "Do Like That" Released: 13 September 2016

Belloved is the debut studio album by Nigerian singer Korede Bello. It was released on 11 March 2017 by Mavin Records with no guest acts and features production handled by Don Jazzy, Cobhams Asuquo, Altims, and Babyfresh. The album spawns eleven songs and three bonus tracks: "Godwin", "Romantic", and "Do Like That", which serve as the album's only singles.

== Background ==
In an interview with Premium Times, Korede Bello admitted that the album's title comes from his surname and the Bible verse Matthew 3:17. He said the project covered about seven years of work. He added that the album's ninth track, "Favourite Song", was written about ten years earlier, and he waited to record it until he chose the right producer, which led him to work with Cobhams. Korede Bello revealed the title of the album on 15 February 2017 through his Instagram handle. The track list for Belloved was revealed a day before its release.

== Composition ==
Belloved features a blend of musical styles produced primarily by in-house Mavin producers, including Don Jazzy, Babyfresh, and Altims. The album incorporates elements of dancehall, as heard in "Let Him Go", which combines electronic synths with a laid-back bounce. "Butterfly" uses recurring motifs and showcases Korede Bello's pop sensibilities. Tracks like "If You Smile," produced by Babyfresh, offer a mix of jùjú and pop influences. The album closes with "Favorite Song," "Good Time," and "Ese Baba," which are upbeat and engaging.

== Singles ==
Belloved did not feature any singles, however, three pre-released songs that serves as bonus tracks were released. The first single, "Godwin", was released on 28 January 2015. Produced by Don Jazzy, it features lyrics that celebrate God's supremacy and power, highlighting that God is victorious in all aspects of human endeavors. It was nominated for Hottest Single of the Year at the 2015 Nigeria Entertainment Awards. It was also nominated for Song of the Year and won Best Pop Single at The Headies 2015. It received a nomination for Song of the Year at the 2016 edition of the MTV Africa Music Awards. The second released single is "Romantic" featuring Tiwa Savage, which was released on 10 December 2015. Also produced by Don Jazzy, the song's release coincided with its official music video directed by Mr. Moe Musa and shot in London. It was nominated for Collaboration of the Year at the 2016 Nigeria Entertainment Awards. The Altims-produced third single "Do Like That" was released on 13 September 2016. It was certified gold in the United States and Canada on 23 September 2021 and 21 June 2022 respectively.

== Critical reception ==
Professional ratings
Review scores
Source	Rating
tooXclusive	3/5 stars
Pulse Nigeria	3.5/5 stars

Joey Akan of Pulse Nigeria expressed that Belloved effectively caters to his diverse fan base with its thematic focus on love and romance, along with gratitude and reflection on his career journey. He noted that the album's variety in musical styles and engaging tracks like "Oh Baybe (Hermosa)" and "Favorite Song" showcase Bello's versatility. Akan concluded, "He succumbs to their demands on 'Belloved'," rating the album 3.5 out of 5. Enisan Daniel of tooXclusive noted that the album showcases a variety of sounds produced mainly by in-house producers, with Cobhams Asuquo contributing to one track. Despite its diverse musical styles, Daniel concluded that "Korede Bello only showed how unready he is for a major project," rating it 3 out of 5. Wilfred Okiche of 360nobs noted that the album caters to his fan base with its familiar sound, but lacks excitement and variety. Okiche observed that while the album is suitable for a younger audience, it may not appeal to older listeners. He concluded, "Still there is a positive here, at least for young Bello. Belloved is the kind of music sensitive adults would encourage their wards to listen to." Chiagoziem Onyekwena of Filter Free wrote that the album was built around a "squeaky clean image" and a "targeted" appeal to his fanbase, commending Korede Bello for finding "a middle ground between pop music and Yoruba folk sounds" while delivering songs driven by a "make the world a better place" outlook. He concluded that "Korede’s opus won’t be everybody’s cup of tea. But as long as his family, friends and fans are sipping it, he won’t have to worry about the non-Bellovers that prefer coffee – and Korede Bello, quite frankly, doesn’t need to," rating the album 53%.

== Track listing ==
Belloved track listing
No.	Title	Writer(s)	Producer(s)	Length
1.	"Korede"	Korede Bello	Altims	3:25
2.	"Oh Baybe (Hermosa)"	Bello	Babyfresh	3:08
3.	"Repete"	Bello	Babyfresh	3:27
4.	"Butterfly"	Bello	Don Jazzy	2:59
5.	"Let Him Go"	Bello	Don Jazzy	3:32
6.	"My People"	Bello	Altims	3:18
7.	"If You Smile"	Bello	Babyfresh	3:34
8.	"Young Presido"	Bello	Don Jazzy	3:12
9.	"Favorite Song"	Bello	Cobhams Asuquo	4:18
10.	"Good Time" (featuring Bellovers)	Bello	Don Jazzy	2:43
11.	"Ese Baba"	Bello	Babyfresh	3:01

Bonus tracks
No.	Title	Writer(s)	Producer(s)	Length
12.	"Godwin"	Bello	Don Jazzy	3:01
13.	"Romantic" (featuring Tiwa Savage)	Bello; Tiwatope Savage	Don Jazzy	3:47
14.	"Do Like That"	Bello	Altims	3:34
Total length:				50:16

Notes

- Track 10 features additional vocals from the Bellovers, Korede Bello's fanbase. It does not count as a real guest appearance.

== Personnel ==
Credits adapted from back cover.

- Altims — production (tracks 1 & 6)
- Baby Fresh — production (tracks 2, 3, 7, & 11)
- Don Jazzy — production (tracks 4, 5, 8 & 10)
- Cobhams Asuquo — production (track 9)
- Korede Bello and Fiokee — live guitar (tracks 2 & 10)
- Fiokee — live guitar (track 3 & 7)
- David Etimi — violin

== Release history ==
Release history and formats for Belloved
Region	Date	Format	Label
Worldwide	11 March 2017	Streaming; digital download	Mavin
