= The Headies Award for Rookie of the Year =

Nigerian music industry award

- Awarded for: The rookie of the year who has had a successful year musically, with the absence of an album in the year under review.
- Country: Nigeria
- Presented by: Hip Hop World Magazine
- First award: 2006
- Final award: 2019
- Website: theheadies.com

The Headies Award for Rookie of the Year is an award presented at The Headies, a ceremony that was established in 2006 and originally called the Hip Hop World Awards. It was first presented to Dammy Krane and Burna Boy in 2012 and is usually presented to upcoming musicians with no debut album out.

== Recipients ==
Rookie of The Year
| Year | Nominee | Result |
|---|---|---|
| 2020 | Bad Boy Timz | Won |
| 2020 | Olakira | Nominated |
| 2020 | Alpha P | Nominated |
| 2020 | Jamopyper | Nominated |
| 2020 | Zinoleesky | Nominated |
| 2019 | Crayon | Nominated |
| 2019 | Buju | Nominated |
| 2019 | Barry Jhay | Won |
| 2019 | Oxlade | Nominated |
| 2018 | KiDi | Nominated |
| 2018 | Air Boy | Nominated |
| 2018 | Teni | Won |
| 2018 | Junior Boy | Nominated |
| 2018 | Peruzzi | Nominated |
| 2015 | Ycee | Won |
| 2015 | Base One | Nominated |
| 2015 | Koker | Nominated |
| 2015 | Pepenazi | Nominated |
| 2015 | Humblesmith | Nominated |
| 2015 | Young GreyC | Nominated |
| 2014 | Reekado Banks | Won |
| 2014 | Young Grey C | Nominated |
| 2014 | Slyde | Nominated |
| 2012 | Dammy Krane and Burna Boy | Won |
