= Dorobucci =

2014 single

Single by The Mavins featuring Don Jazzy, Tiwa Savage, Dr SID, Reekado Banks, Korede Bello, Di'Ja and D'Prince
- Released: 1 May 2014
- Recorded: 2014
- Genre: Afropop
- Length: 4:26
- Label: Mavin Records
- Songwriters: Michael Ajereh; Tiwatope Savage; Sidney Esiri; Ayoleyi Hanniel Solomon; Korede Bello; Hadiza Blell; Charles Enebeli
- Producer: Don Jazzy

Mavins singles chronology
"Dorobucci" (2014)	"Adaobi" (2014)

Music video
- "Dorobucci" on YouTube

"Dorobucci" is a song recorded by Mavin Records signees, who are commonly known as the Mavins. Released on May 1, 2014, the song was jointly recorded by Don Jazzy, Tiwa Savage, Dr SID, Reekado Banks, Korede Bello, Di'Ja and D'Prince. "Dorobucci" received generally mixed reviews from music critics, who commended its production, instrumentation, and composition. On the contrary, the song's music video received mixed reviews. While some critics described the video as brilliant, others said it was dull and not up to par.

"Dorobucci" won Song of the Year at the 2015 MTV Africa Music Awards and Best Pop Single at The Headies 2014.

== Background ==
"Dorobucci" was recorded in early 2014. Prior to revealing details about the song, Don Jazzy tagged several of his Instagram pictures with the hashtag "#Dorobucci". Upon release, some thought "Dorobucci" was about the occult due to the lack of clarity surrounding its meaning. Rejecting the esoteric reference, Don Jazzy declared in May 2014 that the song's last half refers to "anything that is fun, cool, awesome or fantastic."

Mavin Records' fans were given an opportunity to compete in the Channel O Mavin Super Fan competition, which required participants to explain why they are the ultimate Mavin fan. Participants were told to add the "CHOMavinSuperfan" hashtag to their social media posts and follow Channel O Africa's Twitter and Instagram accounts. On July 11, 2014, Don Jazzy announced Natalie Pitswe as the winner of the competition.

== Music video ==
The music video for "Dorobucci", which features a cameo appearance by Pitswe, was filmed in South Africa by Nick Roux of Molotov Cocktail Productions. It was released on July 23, 2014, and uploaded to YouTube at an approximate length of 4 minutes. The video portrayed the Mavins driving exotic cars and hosting Gatsby-style parties. Scenes of the White House and the Empire State Building were shown, along with a golf ball moving from Ikoyi to Washington, DC. The music video received mixed reviews from music critics. Although some saw it as a flop, others felt like it was top notch.

== In popular culture ==
On June 23, 2014, Tonto Dikeh released the single "Sugar Rush", which features vocals by D'banj. The song was criticized for sounding similar to "Dorobucci". It was humorously sung by a contestant on the seventh season of Project Fame West Africa; the contestant's performance video went viral.

== Critical reception ==
"Dorobucci" received mixed reviews from music critics. Pulse Nigeria's Joey Akan described the song as a "mid-tempo feel-good song". Writing for The Punch newspaper, Gbenga Adeniji characterized the song as "funny, artistic and extensive". Toni Kan of This Day commended Jazzy for "sprinkling his sound with the revitalizing ash of novelty" and said the track sounds like "something you would hear from inebriated kegites on a lazy Friday night".

Reviewing for the Daily Times newspaper, Akintayo Opeoluwani criticized the song's lyrics and said it could have been better with D'banj's vocals and wordplay. Chi Ibe of YNaija called the song "average at best" and said it is certainly not one of Don Jazzy's best songs despite its potential to be one of his biggest hits. Ibe was also critical of the video, calling it a "big bore" despite acknowledging its "bright spots". Charles Novia criticized the video for lacking charisma and said it could have been better.

== Live performances ==
Dr SID and Tiwa Savage performed "Dorobucci" for the first time during Star Music Trek's visit to Ekwulobia in May 2014. On May 30, 2014, the Mavins performed the song at the Road to the MAMAs concert.

== Accolades ==
Year	Awards ceremony	Award description(s)	Results	Ref
2015	MTV Africa Music Awards	Song of the Year	Won	
2015	Nigeria Entertainment Awards	Hottest Single of the Year	Nominated	
2015	COSON Song Awards	Hottest Song on the Street	Nominated	
2014	The Headies	Best Pop Single	Won	
2014	The Headies	Song of the Year	Nominated	

== Covers and remixes ==
- Digital download
1. "Dorobucci" (Dr SID and Don Jazzy Highlife version) - 3:56
2. "House of Ace" (Super Eagles cover) - 3:14

== Release history ==
Region	Date	Format	Label
Worldwide	May 1, 2014	Digital download	Mavin Records
