= Feeling (Ladipoe and Buju song) =

Single by Ladipoe and Buju
- Released: 7 May 2021
- Recorded: 2021
- Genre: Afrobeats
- Length: 3:44
- Label: Mavin
- Producer: Andre Vibez

Ladipoe singles chronology
"Rap Messiah" (2021)	"Feeling" (2021)	"Big Energy" (2022)

Buju singles chronology
"So Lovely" (2020)	"Feeling" (2021)	"Outside" (2021)

"Feeling" is a song by Nigerian musicians Ladipoe and Buju. It was released by Mavin Records, through Mavin Global Holdings on 7 May 2021. The song was written by Ladipoe and Buju, and produced by Andre Vibez. "Feeling" spent four consecutive weeks at number 1 on the Nigerian TurnTable Top 50 chart, and became the most played song on Nigeria radio from 26 May to 13 July 2021. The song peaked at number 1 on the TurnTable Top 50 Streaming Songs and peaked at number 3 on the UK Afrobeats Singles Chart. On 14 July 2022, it debut at number 6 on TurnTable newly launched Top Hip-Hop/Rap Songs chart.

== Commercial performance ==
On 17 May 2021, "Feeling" debuted at number 6, on the Nigerian TurnTable Top 50 chart, and reached number one on 7 June 2021, and spent four consecutive weeks at number 1. "Feeling" spent seven consecutive weeks as the most played song on Nigerian radio from 26 May 2021 to 13 July 2021. "Feeling" peaked at number 1 on June 8, 2021, on TurnTable Top 50 Streaming Songs. On 16 May 2021, "Feeling" debut on the Official Afrobeats Chart Top 20 UK chart at number 20 and reached number 3 on 30 May 2021. On 2 September 2021, "Feeling" debut at number 89 on the newly launched South African Local & International Streaming Chart Top 100, on the first week of 2021.

"Feeling" led the 2021 TurnTable Songs of the Summer Nigeria chart. The also debut at number 14 on the Global Nigeria Songs of the Summer chart of 2021, curated by TurnTable and The Native. The song also became the seventh biggest song in TurnTable Top 50 history on the Top Ten Rundown for the chart dated 27 September 2021. On 7 December 2021, Boomplay revealed "Feeling" as one of the most streamed Afrobeats songs of 2021.

== Music video ==
The music video was released on 15 June 2021. It was directed by Kewa Oni and Seun Opabisi for Loup Garou Films.

== Accolades ==
Accolades for "Feeling"
Year	Award	Category	Result	Ref.
2021	All Africa Music Awards	Best African Collaboration	Nominated	
2022	The Headies	Best Rap Single	Won	
2022	The Headies	Best Collaboration	Nominated	

== Charts ==
=== Weekly charts ===
Weekly chart performance for "Feeling"
Chart (2021–2022)	Peak position
Nigeria (TurnTable Top 50)	1
Nigeria Top Hip-Hop/Rap Songs (TurnTable)	6
South Africa (RISA)	89
UK Afrobeats (Official Charts)	3

=== Year-end charts ===
Year-end chart performance for "Feeling"
Chart (2021)	Position
Nigeria End of the Year Top 50 (TurnTable)	2
