= The Headies Award for Next Rated =

Nigerian music industry award

- Awarded for: Most promising upcoming act in the year under review
- Country: Nigeria
- Presented by: Hip Hop World Magazine
- First award: 2006
- Final award: 2022
- Website: theheadies.com

The Headies Award for Next Rated is an award presented at The Headies, a ceremony that was established in 2006 and originally called the Hip Hop World Awards. (Note: The nominees for the 2006 edition are not included in the Recipients table because they are not available.) It was first presented to Aṣa in 2006. In addition to receiving the award plaque, recipients of the Next Rated honor are given a gifted with SUVs at a later date.

In 2022, The Headies announced that the Next Rated category will henceforth receive a brand new 2022 Bentley Bentayga, valued at over N300 million, instead of the SUVs.

== Recipients ==
Next Rated
Year	Nominees	Result
2023	Asake	Won
2023	Victony	Nominated
2023	Spyro	Nominated
2023	Seyi Vibez	Nominated
2023	Young Jonn	Nominated
2022	BNXN	Won
2022	Ayra Starr	Nominated
2022	Lojay	Nominated
2022	Ruger	Nominated
2022	Zinoleesky	Nominated
2020	Omah Lay	Won
2020	Tems	Nominated
2020	Bella Shmurda	Nominated
2020	Oxlade	Nominated
2019	Rema	Won
2019	Lyta	Nominated
2019	Victor AD	Nominated
2019	Fireboy DML	Nominated
2019	Joeboy	Nominated
2019	Zlatan	Nominated
2018	Mayorkun	Won
2018	Maleek Berry	Nominated
2018	Dice Ailes	Nominated
2018	Johnny Drille	Nominated
2018	Zoro	Nominated
2016	Mr Eazi	Won
2016	Ycee	Nominated
2016	Humblesmith	Nominated
2016	Tekno Miles	Nominated
2016	Aramide	Nominated
2015	Reekado Banks	Won
2015	Kiss Daniel	Nominated
2015	Cynthia Morgan	Nominated
2015	Korede Bello	Nominated
2015	Lil Kesh	Nominated
2014	Patoranking	Won
2014	Runtown	Nominated
2014	Orezi	Nominated
2014	Skales	Nominated
2014	Yemi Alade	Nominated
2013	Sean Tizzle	Won
2013	Dammy Krane	Nominated
2013	Burna Boy	Nominated
2013	Seyi Shay	Nominated
2013	Phyno	Nominated
2012	Davido	Won
2012	Eva Alordiah	Nominated
2012	Praiz	Nominated
2012	Chuddy K	Nominated
2011	Wizkid	Won
2011	Ice Prince	Nominated
2011	Olamide	Nominated
2011	Tiwa Savage	Nominated
2010	Skuki	Won
2010	General Pype	Nominated
2010	Mo'Cheddah	Nominated
2010	Jesse Jagz	Nominated
2010	D'Prince	Nominated
2009	Omawumi	Won
2009	YQ	Nominated
2009	MP	Nominated
2009	Kel	Nominated
2009	D'Jinee	Nominated
2008	Wande Coal	Won
2008	GT The Guitarman	Nominated
2008	Banky W.	Nominated
2008	M.I	Nominated
2008	Cyrus da Virus	Nominated
2007	Overdose	Won
2007	Naeto C	Nominated
2007	Lawal Olumo	Nominated
2007	Kage	Nominated
2007	C-Mion	Nominated
2007	Gino	Nominated
2007	Blaise	Nominated
2006	Aṣa	Won
