= Tega Oghenejobo =

Nigerian music executive

- Born: Peter Tega Oghenejobo; Delta State, Nigeria
- Occupations: Music executive; Talent manager
- Known for: Mavin Global Holdings
- Title: Label executive

Peter Tega Oghenejobo, is a Nigerian music executive, and talent manager. He is the Chief Operating Officer, and President of Mavin Global Holdings, the parent company of the Nigerian record label Mavin Records. In 2026, Billboard listed Tega on its Global Power Players list, alongside Don Jazzy.

== Early life ==
Peter Tega Oghenejobo was born in Delta State, Nigeria. He had his primary and secondary education at John F Kennedy International School in Warri, Delta State, and went on to pursue his tertiary education from the University of Port Harcourt, where he obtained a degree in Computer Science.

In 2024, he tells BET, "My journey in the music industry began during my university years, where I actively engaged in various capacities related to music".

== Career ==
He began his career at Mo' Hits Records as part of the street promotional team, where he was involved in grassroots marketing efforts aimed at increasing the visibility and popularity of the label's music across local venues in Delta State, including restaurants and other popular places in Warri. He served as road manager to D'Prince.

Following the dissolution of Mo' Hits in 2012, he relocated to Lagos and joined Mavin Records. He became Brand and Marketing Executive. In 2017, he was appointed Head of Label Partnerships, and in 2018, he became Chief Operating Officer. In 2024, he was named President and Chief Operating Officer of Mavin Global Holdings.

=== Mavins ===
Tega was part of the team that played a key role in securing a multimillion-dollar equity investment partnership between Kupanda Holdings and Mavins in 2019. In 2022, he played a key role in facilitating the label's international distribution partnership involving Virgin, Mavins, and Jonzing, including releases by Rema such as the remix Calm Down, with American singer Selena Gomez. He was also involved in the team that facilitated UMG's acquisition of a majority stake in Mavin in 2024. Tega also designed the Mavin Artist Academy, a development programme aimed at nurturing newly signed artists, keeping them out of public scrutiny for a minimum of eighteen months prior to their debut releases.

== Awards and recognition ==
=== Awards and nominations ===
Year	Awards ceremony	Category	Recipient	Results
2015	The Beatz Awards	Best Artist Manager	Himself	Nominated
2019	The Future Awards Africa	Professional Service	Himself	Nominated
2024	TurnTable Music Awards	Outstanding Achievement in Executive Role in Music	Himself	Won

=== Recognition ===
- On 26 March 2025, TurnTable listed Tega on its Power List of 2024, and was named #1 Nigerian Music Executive for 2024.
- On 17 January 2026, TurnTable listed Tega on its list of The Greatest Music Executives of the 21st Century.
- On 9 March 2026, Billboard listed Tega on its Global Power Players list of 2026.
