= Collectiv3 =

Musical group

The Collectiv3
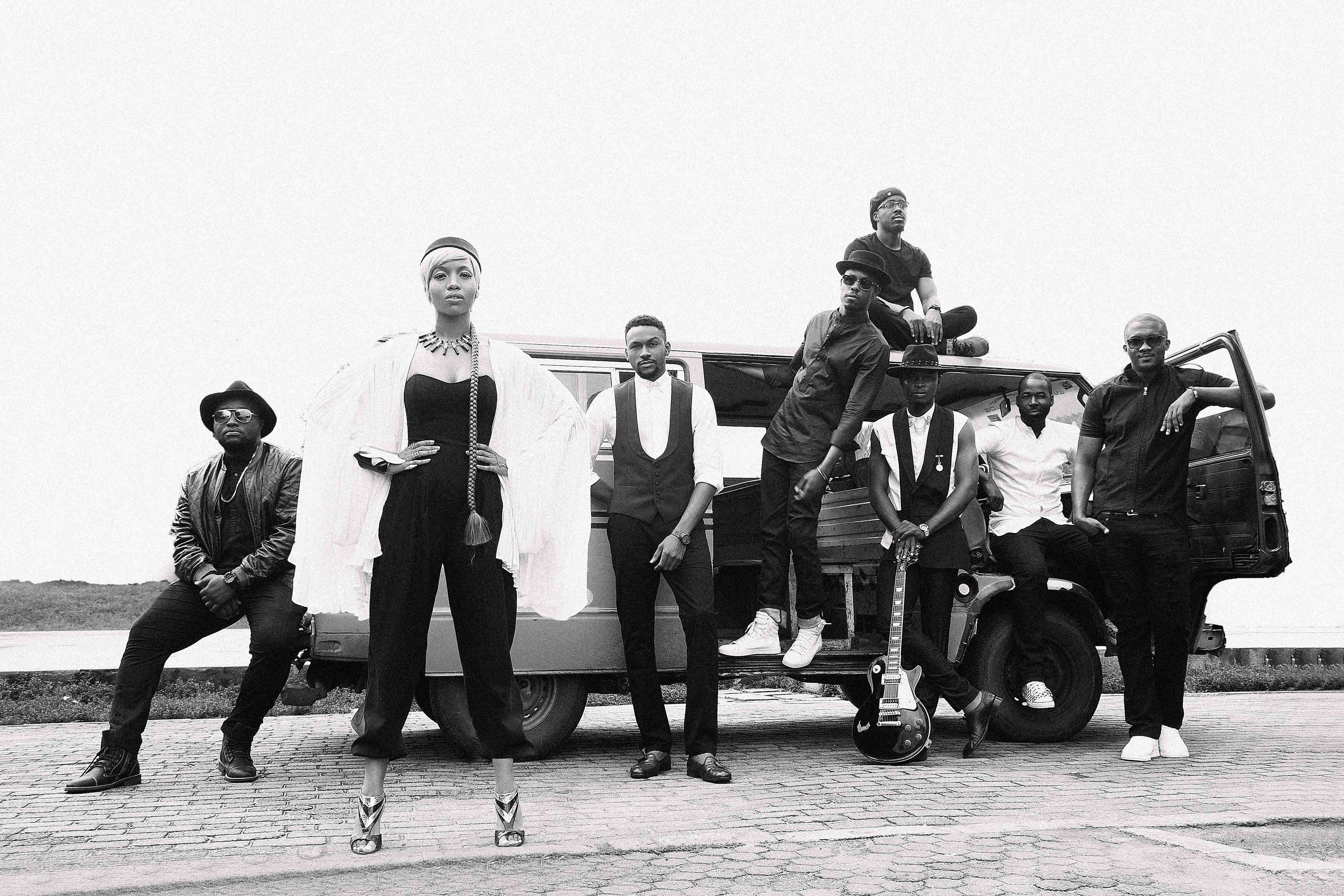

Background information
- Origin: Lagos, Nigeria
- Genres: Futuristic Funk; Hip hop; Electronic Dance Music; Electronic R&B
- Years active: 2015-present
- Labels: Written Notes MP, Ltd.
- Members: Temi Dollface; Show Dem Camp; Funbi; Poe; IKON; Kid Konnect; Nsikak; Tec; Ghost
- Website: www.collectiv3the.com

The Collectiv3 is a group of Nigerian musical artists that include producers IKON and Kid Konnect, singers Funbi and Temi Dollface, rapper Poe, rap duo Show Dem Camp, and guitarist and producer Nsikak.

== Formation ==
The Collectiv3 was assembled by executive producer Chin Okeke. Okeke had spent years watching the individual members work on their respective projects without receiving widespread recognition. The idea of coming together to start a "free spirit" movement had been discussed over the years, but it wasn't until early 2015 that things finally started to come together and the collective officially took place.

== Debut LP ==
"The Collectiv3 LP" was released on October 1, 2015, in honor of Nigeria's fifty-fifth year of independence. Its members hope to provide an alternative to Nigeria's mainstream music industry. "The Collectiv3 LP" also serves as a showcase for artists whose interpretation and expression of Africanism in music is intentionally unique and designed to evoke strong emotions. An album review published on the Nigerian news and entertainment website "Pulse.ng" describes their LP as "melodiously maverick." The album is available to stream and download for free at The Collectiv3's website.

Beyond the music, The Collectiv3's goal is to move culture, celebrate individuality and the self, inspire one another, and have the courage to bare themselves and their art.
