= Di'Ja =

Sierra Leonean -Nigerian singer

Hadiza
- Born: Hadiza Blell; 14 August 1984 (age 42)
- Genres: R&B; pop; Afrobeat; Afropop
- Occupations: Singer; songwriter
- Years active: 2002–present
- Label: Mavin Records
- Website: dijanation.com

Hadiza Blell (born 14 August 1984), known professionally as Di'Ja, is a Nigerian singer and songwriter. In 2009, she released her first single "Rock Steady", which was nominated for Best Urban/R&B Single at the 2009 Canadian Radio Music Awards. She also won the Best New Artist award at the 2008 Beat Music Awards. In 2014, she signed with Mavin Records.

== Early life and education ==
Di'Ja has lived in Nigeria, Sierra Leone, the United States and Canada. Her mother, Asma'u Blell is Nigerian, while her father, Joseph Blell is Sierra Leonean.

Di'Ja earned a joint degree in biology and psychology.

== Career ==
Di'Ja began her music career in 2008. In 2012, she released several singles, including "Dan'Iska (Rudebwoy)", "Hold On (Ba Damuwa)" and "How Can We Be Friends". On 14 February 2014, Di'Ja signed a record deal with Don Jazzy's Mavin Records. "Yaro", her first official single under the label was released the same day. It infuses Hausa and Krio dialects in honour of her Nigerian and Sierra Leonean heritage.

In May 2014, Di'Ja was featured on "Dorobucci" alongside labelmates Don Jazzy, Dr Sid, Tiwa Savage, D'Prince, Korede Bello and Reekado Banks. She was also featured on "Arise", alongside Don Jazzy and Reekado Banks. On 15 December 2017, Di'Ja released her extended play Aphrodija, featuring guest appearances from Tiwa Savage and Reekado Banks.

In May 2017, she performed the song "One Talk" at the Calabar edition of the Mega Music Nationwide Tour organised by Globacom Telecommunication Company.

== Awards and nominations ==
| Year | Event | Prize | Recipient | Result | Ref |
|---|---|---|---|---|---|
| 2014 | Nigeria Entertainment Awards | Most Promising Act to Watch | Herself | Nominated | |
| 2009 | Canadian Radio Music Awards | Best Urban/R&B Single | "Rock Steady" | Nominated | |
| 2008 | Beat Music Awards | Best New Artist | Herself | Won | |

== Discography ==
=== Singles ===
| Year | Title | Album |
|---|---|---|
| 2008 | "Rock Steady" | Non-album single |
| 2012 | "How Can We Be Friends" | Non-album single |
| 2013 | "Dan'Iska (Rudebwoy)" | Non-album single |
| 2013 | "Hold On (Ba Damuwa)" | Non-album single |
| 2014 | "Yaro" | Non-album single |
| 2014 | "Dorobucci" (with Don Jazzy, Tiwa Savage, Dr Sid, D'Prince, Reekado Banks, and Korede Bello) | Non-album single |
| 2014 | "Awww" | Non-album single |
| 2014 | "Adaobi" (with Reekado Banks, Korede Bello, and Don Jazzy) | Non-album single |
| 2015 | "Looku Looku" | Non-album single |
| 2016 | "Take Kiss" | Non-album single |
| 2017 | "Air" | Non-album single |
| 2019 | "Omotena" | Di'Ja EP |
| 2024 | ''Soyaya'' | Single |

== Videography ==
| Year | Title | Album | Director | Ref |
|---|---|---|---|---|
| 2016 | "Take Kiss" | Non-album single | Adasa Cookey | |
| 2016 | "Falling for You" | Non-album single | Unlimited L.A | |
| 2014 | "Aww" | Non-album single | Unlimited L.A | |
