= Godwin (song) =

Single by Korede Bello

from the album Belloved
- Released: 28 January 2015
- Recorded: 2015
- Genre: Afropop
- Length: 2:59
- Label: Mavin Records
- Songwriter: Korede Bello
- Producer: Don Jazzy

Korede Bello singles chronology
| "Jingle Bell" (2014) | "Godwin" (2015) | "Romantic" (2015) |

Music video
- "Godwin" on YouTube

"Godwin" is a song by Nigerian songwriter and singer Korede Bello. It was released on 28 January 2015, by Mavin Records. The song features backup vocals from Don Jazzy.

== Critical reception ==
"Godwin" was met with positive reviews from music critics. A writer for Jaguda rated it 3.5 out of 5, adding: "On first listen, one can’t help but enjoy the totally positive and hopeful message about it.....Overall it’s a good song, and most importantly, a song that’s very simple but still very powerful with its message." Chibuzor of 360nobs acknowledged the song for cutting "across various demographics" and said it is "full of cheeriness and drive; a cool number, indigenous, original, repeat-worthy and all".

== Music video ==
The music video of "Godwin" was directed by Adasa Cookey. Filmed in Lagos, Nigeria, it was uploaded to YouTube on 3 June 2015. The video amassed over one million views five weeks after its release. Moreover, it featured cameo appearances from Bovi, AY, Elenu, Yaw, Dr SID, and Labi.

== Live performance and criticism ==
On 5 April 2015, Korede Bello was invited to perform the song at a church. His invitation to perform didn't sit well with some people who felt secular artists shouldn't perform on sacred altars. He voiced his opinion on Instagram, saying, "Mixed reactions about me glorifying God in the church! Am I not allowed to give my testimony?"

== Awards and nominations ==
| Year | Award ceremony | Prize | Result |
|---|---|---|---|
| 2015 | Nigeria Entertainment Awards | Hottest Single of the Year | Nominated |
| 2015 | African Muzik Magazine Awards | Song of the Year | Nominated |
| 2015 | COSON Song Awards | Most Uncommon Song | Won |
| 2015 | COSON Song Awards | Hottest Song on the Street | Nominated |
| 2015 | COSON Song Awards | The Song of Songs | Nominated |
| 2015 | The Headies | Best Pop Single | Won |
| 2015 | The Headies | Song of the Year | Nominated |
| 2015 | tooXclusive Awards | Certified Banger of the Year | Nominated |
| 2015 | tooXclusive Awards | Best Street-Hop Track | Nominated |
| 2015 | Nigerian Music Video Awards | Best Contemporary Afro Video | Won |
| 2015 | 4Syte TV Music Video Awards | Best African Act Video | Won |
| 2016 | MTV Africa Music Awards | Song of the Year | Nominated |

== Personnel ==
Song credits

- Writing – Korede Bello
- Production – Don Jazzy

Video credits

- Director – Adasa Cookey
