= Solar Plexus (album) =

Compilation album by Mavin Records
- Released: May 8, 2012
- Recorded: 2012
- Studio: Mavin Records Studio, Lagos, Nigeria
- Genre: Afrobeats
- Length: 41:43
- Label: Mavin Records
- Producer: Don Jazzy (also exec.)

Mavin Records chronology
Solar Plexus (2012)	Chapter X (2022)

Singles from Solar Plexus
- 1. "Take Banana"; 2. "Oma Ga"

Solar Plexus is the debut compilation album released by Mavin Records on May 8, 2012. Produced entirely by Don Jazzy, the album comprises thirteen tracks and was made available for free digital download. It contains solo tracks recorded by D'Prince, Tiwa Savage, Wande Coal and Dr SID. The album's release coincided with the record label's launch date. Solar Plexus was supported by the singles "Take Banana" and "Omo Ga". The album received generally negative reviews from music critics, who called it a "rushed project" and considered it to be "Don Jazzy's weakest produced album of his career".

== Background and promotion ==
The album's recording sessions took place at Mavin Records Studio in Lagos. Solar Plexus was mixed and mastered by James "LeRock" Loughrey at Tardis Studios in the United Kingdom. Fans hoped for reconciliation between Don Jazzy and D'banj, but weren't certain on the future of Mo' Hits Records. In the midst of this, Don Jazzy used Twitter to announce the launch of Mavin Records and sought support from fans.

"Take Banana" was released as the album's lead single. D'Prince remixed the song for his debut studio album, Frenzy! (2012). "Omo Ga" was released as the album's second single; a teaser of its music video was released.

== Critical reception ==
Professional ratings
Review scores
Source	Rating
Nigerian Sounds	6.8/10
TayoTV	6/10
TooXclusive	2/5 stars
Nigerian Entertainment Today	2/5 stars
Hip Hop World Magazine	2/5 stars

Solar Plexus received generally negative reviews from music critics. A writer for Nigerian Sounds granted the album a 6.8 rating out of 10, applauding Don Jazzy for producing the entire album in three days. Amb Noni, writing for the website Tayo TV, rated the album 6 out of 10 and said it was "rushed". In a review for Hip Hop World Magazine, James Silas gave the album 2 stars out of 5, saying the "haste to put out an album to officially unveil Mavin Records sort of affected the total composition of the project." Ogaga Sakapide of TooXclusive also assigned 2 stars out of 5, describing the album as "a hurriedly packaged work with so-so lyrics, ill-matched materials and several hit-miss moments."

Wilfred Okiche, whose review was posted on the website 360nobs, called Solar Plexus a "vanity project for Don Jazzy to prove he's still got it after all that happened and unfortunately everyone else is relegated to second place". YNaija's Chi Ibe said the album was "a mistake". Ayomide Tayo of Nigerian Entertainment Today rated Solar Plexus 2 out of 5, calling it Don Jazzy's weakest produced album of his career."

== Track listing ==
All tracks produced by Michael Collins Ajereh, professionally known as Don Jazzy.
No.	Title	Writer(s)	Length
1.	"Intro"	Michael Ajereh; Sidney Esiri	0:42
2.	"I'm a Mavin" (featuring Don Jazzy, Tiwa Savage, Dr SID, Wande Coal, and D'Prince)	Ajereh, Tiwatope Savage; Esiri; Wande Ojosipe; Charles Enebeli	5:19
3.	"Oma Ga" (featuring Tiwa Savage)	Ajereh; Savage; Esiri; Ojosipe	3:31
4.	"YOLO" (featuring Dr SID)	Ajereh; Esiri	3:31
5.	"See Me Ri" (featuring Wande Coal)	Ajereh; Esiri; Ojosipe; Towa Ojosipe	3:27
6.	"Take Banana" (featuring D'Prince)	Ajereh; Enebeli	3:13
7.	"C.P.R (Kiss of Life)" (featuring Dr SID)	Ajereh; Esiri	4:06
8.	"Forever" (featuring Wande Coal)	Ajereh; Esiri; Ojosipe; Ojosipe	4:19
9.	"Why You Over There" (featuring D'Prince)	Ajereh; Enebeli	3:24
10.	"Chocolate" (featuring Dr SID)	Ajereh; Esiri; Enebeli	3:26
11.	"Pretty Girls" (featuring Wande Coal)	Ajereh; Ojosipe	3:26
12.	"Amarachi" (featuring D'Prince)	Ajereh; Enebeli	3:13
13.	"Outro"	Ajereh; Esiri	0:06

== Personnel ==
- Michael Collins Ajereh – executive producer, creative director, writer, producer
- Tiwatope Savage – primary artist, writer
- Sidney Onoriode Esiri – primary artist, writer
- Oluwatobi Wande Ojosipe – primary artist, writer
- Charles Enebeli – primary artist, writer
- Towa Ojosipe – writer
- James "Lerock" Loughrey – mixing engineer

== Release history ==
Region	Date	Format	Label
Nigeria	May 8, 2012	CD, Digital download	Mavin Records
