= Reekado Banks =

Nigerian musician

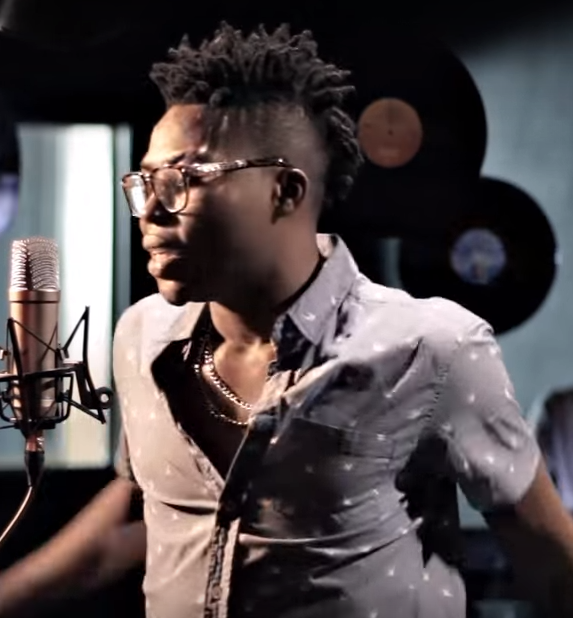

Background information
- Also known as: Spicy
- Born: Ayoleyi Hanniel Solomon; 6 December 1993 (age 32); Lagos, Lagos State, Nigeria
- Genre: Afropop
- Occupations: Singer; songwriter
- Years active: 2008–present
- Labels: Banks Music; Virgin Music Nigeria

Ayoleyi Hanniel Solomon (born 6 December 1993), who is better known by his stage name Reekado Banks, is a Nigerian singer and songwriter. He was signed to Mavin Records between 2014 and 2018, and went by the stage name Spicy before his record deal with the label. Banks won Rookie of the Year at The Headies 2014, and received the controversial Next Rated award at The Headies 2015. His debut studio album, Spotlight, which was released on 1 September 2016, debuted at number 10 on the Billboard World Albums chart.

== Early life and education ==
Reekado Banks is the last-born child of a family that adores music. His mother is a caterer and pastor, while his father is a clergyman from Ondo State. He grew up in a disciplined household, as both of his parents were pastors. He completed secondary school at the age of 14 and started recording music in 2008. All of his previous songs were produced by his older brother Temi Solomon, who taught him the fundamentals of writing, singing, and producing. He derived the stage name Reekado Banks by combining the meaning of the two names; the former part of his stage name translates to "strong ruler", while the latter part means "wealth". In 2014, Banks graduated from the University of Lagos with a degree in history and strategic study. He has cited Don Jazzy, 2face Idibia, DJ Jimmy Jatt, Olamide and M.I as his key musical inspirations.

== Career ==
=== Mavin Records deal and artistry ===
After his older brother submitted some of his songs to Mavin Records through an internet talent search, the label selected his entries from over 5,000 submissions and signed him to a record deal. In an interview with the National Mirror, he said his brother submitted his songs and communicated with the label on his behalf without his initial consent. Banks also said he is a versatile artist who makes music with the thought that people are different and have varying taste.

=== 2014–present: Singles and Mavin Records departure ===
On 21 February 2014, Banks premiered the single "Turn It Up", which coincided with the day he signed with Mavin Records. The song features vocals by Tiwa Savage and was released as his first official single under Mavin Records. The highly regarded song "Dorobucci" included Banks, Don Jazzy, Korede Bello, Savage, Di'Ja, Dr SID, and D'Prince. Additionally, he collaborated on the tracks "Adaobi", "Arise", and "Looku Looku" with the previously mentioned musicians. On 13 February 2015, he released the Don Jazzy-produced single "Katapot", which was alleged to be a diss track towards D'banj and Wande Coal. In February 2015, Don Jazzy debunked the allegations in a series of tweets. In a March 2015 interview with newspaper Vanguard, Banks said he created "Katapot" for his fans.

In July 2015, Banks and the Nigerian cellular provider Globacom inked an endorsement agreement. He declared his exit from Mavin Records and the debut of his recording outfit, Banks Music, on 7 December 2018. Vanguard revealed in September 2019 that Banks had fired his older brother as manager. In 2021, he released the single "Ozumba Mbadiwe". Olukorede Ikazoboh, who heads the Nigerian arm of Virgin Music, announced that the label will be in charge of distributing Banks and Darkoo's music.

In July 2025, Banks released his second studio album, The Game Needs You.

== Discography ==
Studio albums

- Spotlight (2016)
- The Game Needs You (2025)

Extended plays (EPs)

- Off the Record (2020)
- OTR, Vol. 2 (2021)

Selected singles

Title	Year	Release date
"Turn It Up" (featuring Tiwa Savage)	2014	21 February 2014
"Dorobucci" (with Don Jazzy Tiwa Savage, Dr SID, D’Prince, Korede Bello and Di'Ja)	2014	1 May 2014
"Adaobi" (with Don Jazzy, Korede Bello and Di'Ja)	2014	27 May 2014
"Chop Am"	2014	8 August 2014
"Arise" (with Don Jazzy and Di'Ja)	2014	20 September 2014
"Looku Looku" (with Don Jazzy Tiwa Savage, Dr SID, D’Prince, Korede Bello and Di'Ja)	2014	31 October 2014
"Katapot"	2015	13 February 2015
"Corner"	2015	9 July 2015
"Sugar Baby"	2015	10 July 2015
"Tomorrow"	2015	11 July 2015
"Oluwa Ni"	2016	15 January 2016
"Standard"	2016	5 June 2016
"Spotlight"	2016	1 September 2016
Easy (Jeje)	2017	29 July 2017
"Kiss Me"	2017	29 July 2017
"Like" (with Tiwa Savage and Fiokee)	2017	6 December 2017
"Pull Up"	2018	3 April 2018
"Bio Bio" (featuring Duncan Mighty)	2018	9 July 2018
"Blessings On Me"	2018	26 September 2018
"Yawa"; Banks Music (featuring Reekado Banks and DJ Young)	2019	21 March 2019
"Maria"	2019	29 March 2019
"Rora"	2019	5 September 2019
"In Put In Pressure"	2019	29 November 2019
"You Dey Mad" (featuring AttiFaya)	2020	20 November 2020
"Speak to Me" (featuring Tiwa Savage)	2020	26 November 2020
"Need More" (featuring Kida Kudz and EO)	2020	27 November 2020
"Happy Yourself"	2020	27 November 2020
"Ozumba Mbadiwe"	2021	21 October 2021
