= Johnny Drille =

Nigerian musician (born 1990)

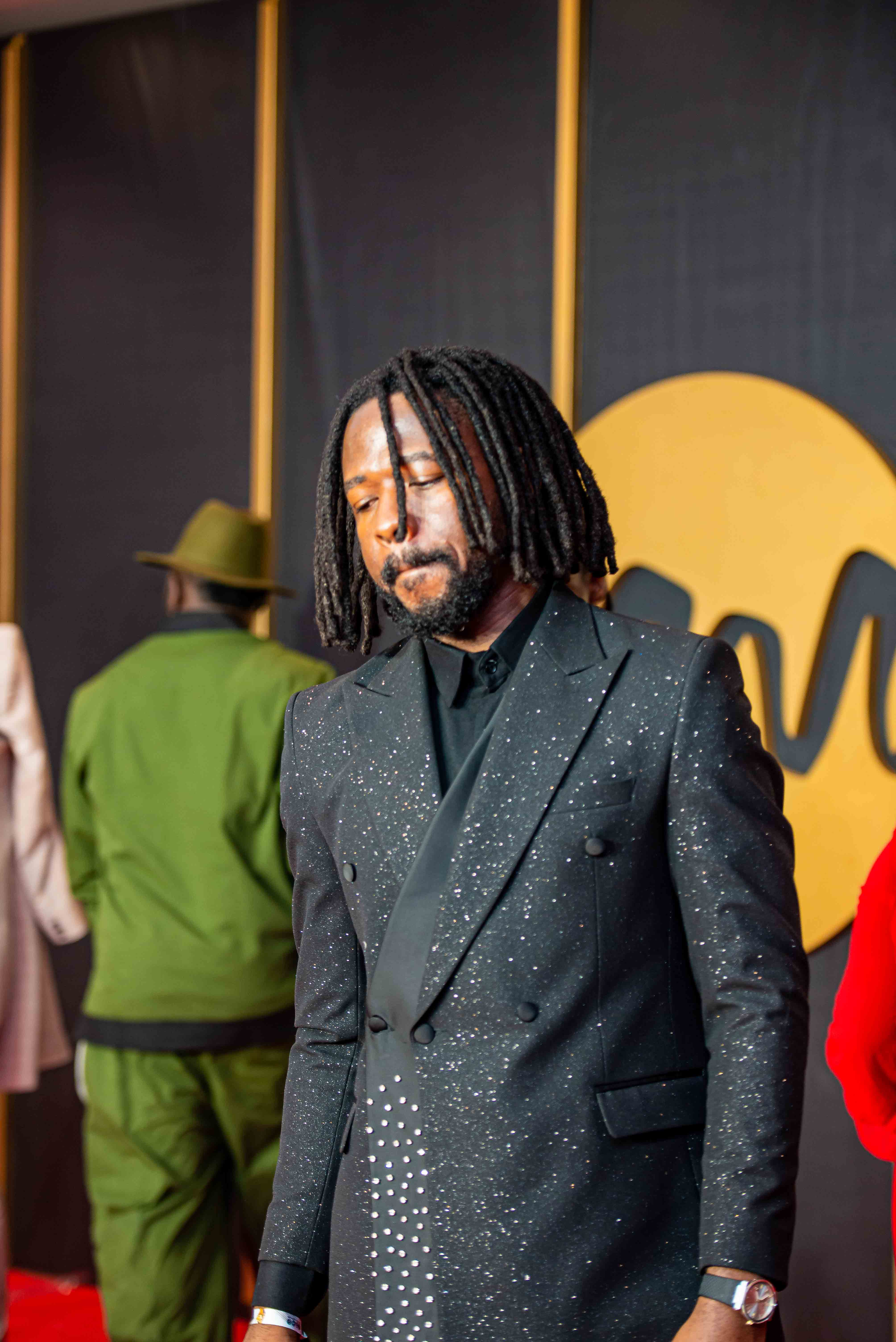

Background information
- Also known as: Johnny Drille
- Born: John Ighodaro; July 5, 1990 (age 36); Edo, Nigeria
- Genres: Folk; alternative rock
- Occupations: Singer; songwriter; record producer; sound engineer
- Instruments: Vocals; guitar; Piano
- Years active: 2012–present
- Label: Mavin Records
- Spouse: Rima Tahini

Johnny Drille (born John Ighodaro; 5 July 1990) is a Nigerian singer, songwriter, and music producer. He rose to prominence in 2015 after releasing a cover of Di’Ja’s song "Awww", which attracted the attention of Don Jazzy, the founder of Mavin Records. He is known for his emotive style, blending folk, soul, and African influences.

== Early life and education ==
Johnny Drille was born and raised in Edo State, Nigeria. His father is a school principal and clergyman. He has four siblings.

He started singing in his father's church at an early age. He attended the University of Benin, Benin City, where he studied English and Literature.

== Career ==
Johnny Drille began his musical career in church. He was one of the contestants on the sixth season of Project Fame West Africa in 2013. In 2015, he released a cover of Di'Ja's "Awww", which caught the attention of Mavin's CEO Don Jazzy.

His debut single "Wait for Me" was released in 2015. It was nominated for Best Alternative Song at The Headies 2016. He teamed up with Niniola, a fellow season 6 contestant, to record "Start All Over" in 2016.

In February 2017, he signed a record deal with Mavin Records.

On September 3, 2021, he released his debut album, a fourteen track project, titled Before We Fall Asleep featuring Nigerian artists Ayra Starr, Ladipoe, Lagos community choir, Don Jazzy, Chylde, Kwitte, Cilsoul and the classic afro R&B group, Styl-Plus under the label Mavin Records.

=== 2024 activities ===
In late 2024, Drille collaborated with Don Jazzy on a joint seven-track EP titled Hard Guy Confessions, which explored vulnerability and love through soul, funk, and alternative pop sounds.

=== 2025 activities ===
In April 2025, Johnny Drille collaborated with Fireboy DML on the single "Angelina". The music video premiered in May 2025.

In spring 2025, he launched his first United Kingdom tour titled Johnny’s Room Live UK Tour, organized by Fins Entertainment. The tour included performances in London (KOKO Camden), Birmingham, Glasgow (SWG3), and Manchester (Academy 3).

In May 2025, Drille appeared at the Africa Magic Viewers' Choice Awards (AMVCA), where he engaged with fans and performed alongside other major artists. He also headlined the GENTI Festival in Abuja alongside The Cavemen and other Afrofusion acts.

== Personal life ==
Johnny is married to music executive Rima Tahini. In November 2023, they announced the birth of their daughter Amaris Esohe Ighodaro.

== Discography ==
Studio albums

- Before We Fall Asleep (2021)
- Before the Morning Light (2026)

EPs

- Home (2022)
- Hard Guy Confessions (with Don Jazzy) (2024)

== Awards and nominations ==
Year	Event	Prize	Recipient	Result	Ref
2016	The Headies	Best Alternative Song	"Wait for Me"	Nominated	
2018	The Headies	Best Vocal Performance (Male)	"Romeo & Juliet"	Nominated	
2018	The Headies	Best R&B Single	"Romeo & Juliet"	Nominated	
2018	The Headies	Best Alternative Song	"Romeo & Juliet"	Nominated	
2018	The Headies	Next Rated	Himself	Nominated	
2019	The Headies	Best Alternative Song	"Finding Efe"	Won	
2019	The Headies	Best Vocal Performance (Male)	"Finding Efe"	Nominated	
