= D'Prince =

Nigerian music executive (born 1986)

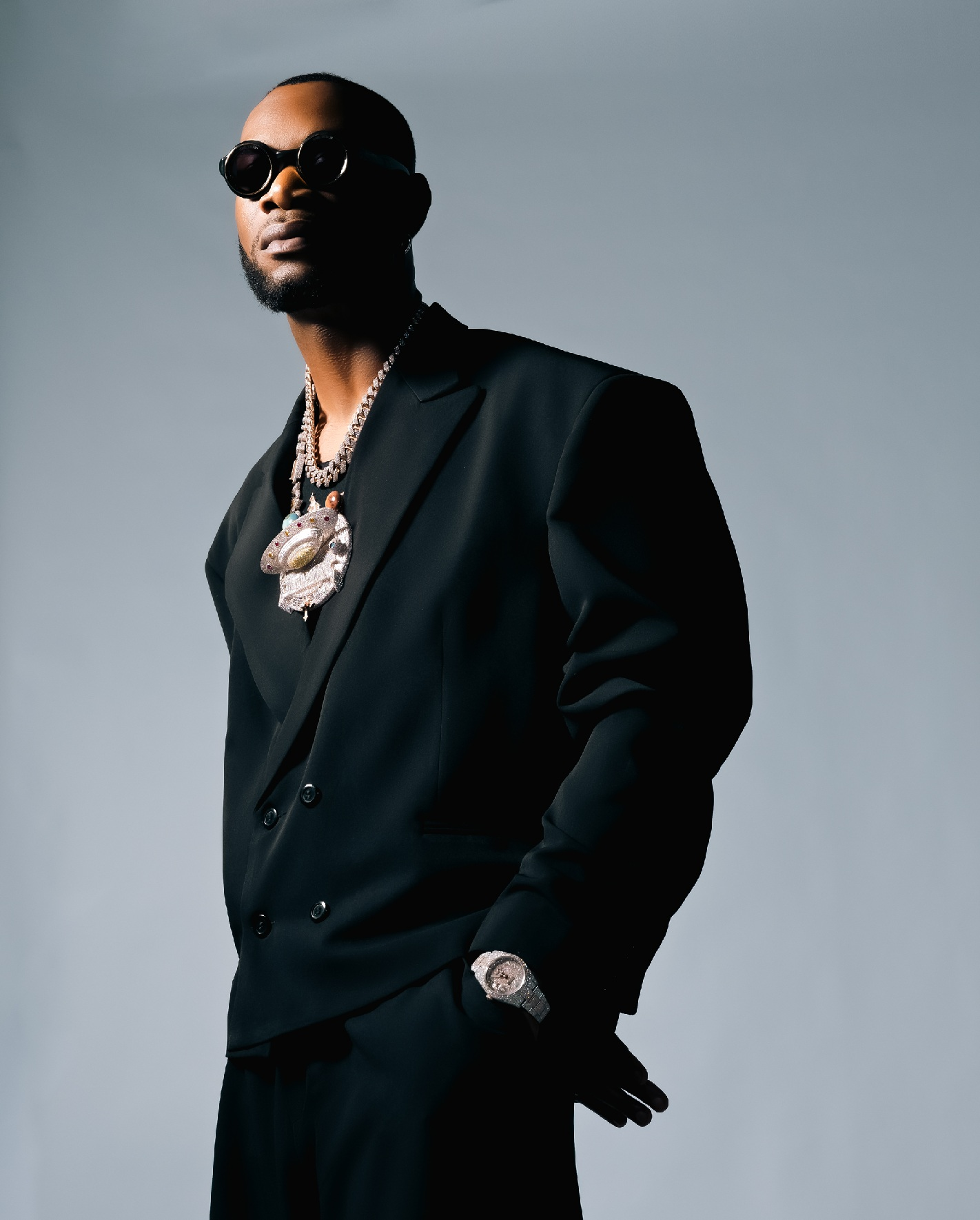
- D'Prince in 2025
- Born: Charles Enebeli; 23 October 1986 (age 40); Ajegunle, Lagos State
- Occupations: music executive; singer; songwriter; entrepreneur; promoter; philanthropist; executive producer
- Years active: 2005–present
- Known for: Jonzing World
- Title: Record label executive
- Board member of: Jonzing World Entertainment
- Musical career
- Also known as: Omoba; El Jefe
- Origin: Isoko, Delta State
- Genre: Afropop, Afrobeats
- Label: Jonzing World

Charles Enebeli (born 23 October 1986), known by his stage name D'Prince, is a Nigerian Grammy-nominated music executive, singer, songwriter, entrepreneur, promoter, and philanthropist. He is the founder and CEO of the entertainment company Jonzing World Entertainment, founded in 2018 with subsidiaries Jonzing World, Jonzing World Publishing, Jonzing World Production, and Jonzing World Management, established in 2019. D'Prince is known for pioneering the West African pop culture and Afrobeats.

Under Jonzing World, D'Prince signed the following artists, including Rema, Gdzilla, Bagetti, and Glorious. He is credited for the crossover success of Rema's single "Calm Down", which earned Jonzing multiple platinum certification records from eleven countries, including the United States. He also served as an executive producer on Rema's studio albums, including Heis, which was nominated at the 67th Grammy Awards for Best Global Music Album and earned him a special recognition from The Recording Academy.

== Early life ==
Charles Enebeli was born in Lagos on 23 October 1986. He was born to Collins Enebeli from Delta State, a businessman and a musical production manager and founder of the record label Sagitarious Productions, and Patience Enebeli, an international Business tycoon. D'Prince is the younger brother of music mogul and CEO of Mavin Records, Don Jazzy. Music has always been in this family and he is not strange to the Music business. D'Prince is also known as "Omoba", which means a "Child of a King" in Yoruba language.

D'Prince attended King's College, Lagos for his secondary level education and then decided to follow his passion in music.

== Career ==
As a tribute to his mentor Fela and Bob Marley, D'Prince uses a fusion of Afrobeat and Afropop to bring his music to life in honor of his mentors. His songs are based on fact & life, with a deeper meaning which documents the struggle of a young Nigerian trying to achieve his dreams. He performs in Igbo, English and Pidgin English.

=== 2005–2012: Mo' Hits records, and breakthrough single "Omoba" ===
D'Prince was asked to be a part of the Mo' Hits Records in 2005 after his elder brother Don Jazzy came back from the UK to promote the record label in Nigeria. Ever since he joined Mo' Hits Records in 2005 he has been behind the scenes working on his personal album Frenzy which released under the record label in 2012.

D'Prince has recorded many songs for Mo' Hits Records and also the Mo' Hits Records compilation album Curriculum Vitae which was released in December 2007. It included hit singles, "Booty Call", "Close To You", "Masquerade", "Stop The Violence", "Igbe Mi", "Hey Girl", "What You Want To Do To Me", "Oh No", which was the lead single. On 25 November 2009, D'Prince released his single titled "Omoba" and was relaunched in 2010. On 13 April 2010 the official Video of the song "Omoba" was released. through Mo' Hits Records.

=== 2012–2019: Mavin Records, Frenzy!, "O.Y.O", "Bestie", and "Gucci Gang" ===
D'Prince moved to Mavin Records after the dissolution of Mo' Hits Records in 2012. On 8 May 2012, Mavin Records released its first compilation album Solar Plexus, featuring D'Prince, among others. He recorded "Take Banana" and "Amarachi" as solos on the album, which became a major hit. On 31 October 2012, he released three singles "Goody Bag", "Call The Police", and "Real G" featuring M.I Abaga off his debut studio album Frenzy. On 5 November 2012, he released his debut studio album Frenzy!. The album features Wande Coal, Don Jazzy, Dr SID, Wizkid, Timaya, M.I Abaga, Tiwa Savage, Bracket, Sinzu (fka Sauce Kid), Eva Alordiah, General Pype, and Ice Prince. The deluxe version was released on Truspot. His studio album was exclusively produced by his brother Don Jazzy, with the likes of BabyFresh, Burssbrain (fka Altims), Aone Beats, Spellz and Joshbeatz.

In 2014, he released "OYO (On Your Own)", a wake-up call to the nation to fight for themselves. The record was produced by Don Jazzy, with a voiceover from him in the song of him saying "Hey my men, now is not the time, it's the time to sit back and think about your life". The song received positive reviews from critics, with Chinwe Okafor of YNaija said the record was "probably the best thing he has done in a while." Chinwe Okafor described the song as a modern-day Fela vibe, rating the song 3.5 out of 5, and passing the song with A for its effort, and acting skill, saying, "The video basically describes the lackadaisical beings in the country." On 30 November, the visuals for "O.Y.O" were released and shot in Lagos by Clarence Peters.

On 3 August 2015, he released "Bestie", featuring Don Jazzy, and Babyfresh, who also played a major role as producers of the song. On 2 October 2017, he released "Sade", produced by Babyfresh. Same day he released the music video of Sade, shot by Unlimited LA. On 16 February 2018, he released "Gucci Gang", produced by Don Jazzy. On 27 April 2018, he released the music video, directed by Director Q. On 28 February 2018, Rema, post a viral freestyle of "Gucci Gang" on Instagram, tagging him, and Don Jazzy on the post, which caught D'Prince's attention, and secured Rema a record deal with Jonzing World.

On 3 May 2019, he released a three-track extended play, titled Lavida, with production handled by Altims and Babyfresh, and guest appearances from Rema and Don Jazzy.

=== 2020–present:Mavin's departure and the Foundation ===
On 9 May 2020, Guardian Life Magazine reported that D'Prince departed Mavin Records following the release of his extended play Lavida and the expiration of his eight-year contract on 8 May 2020. In an interview on Twitter, he broke the news in response to a question about his recording contract with Mavin Records and the relationship with his label, Jonzing World. D'Prince said, "My record deal with Mavin Records ended on 8 May 2020, and it has been an amazing 16 years under my brother Don Jazzy".

On 23 October 2024, D'Prince officially launched the Charles Enebeli Humanitarian Foundation in Asaba, Delta State, to celebrate his 38 birthday.

=== Jonzing World ===
On 22 March 2019, he launched his record label, and management company Jonzing World. An imprint of Mavin Records, and home to recording artists Rema, and Ruger. On 21 January 2021, Jonzing World released One Shirt, featuring Ruger, D'Prince, and Rema. Same day, Jonzing World released the visual to One Shirt, shot by Priorgold Pictures.

== Personal life ==
On 23 May 2025, D'Prince took to X, in a series of tweets and declared himself a vegetarian, for his health, mind, and future.

== Discography ==
- Frenzy! – 2012
- Lavida (EP) – 2019

=== Singles ===
As lead artist
Year	Title	Album
2015	"Nonso" (featuring Reekado Banks)	TBA
2015	"Bestie" (featuring Don Jazzy & Baby Fresh)	TBA
2014	"Oga Titus" (featuring Don Jazzy)	TBA
2014	"Ojoro cancel" (featuring Wizkid)	TBA
2014	"OYO (On Your Own)"	TBA
2014	"Gentleman" (featuring Davido & Don Jazzy)	TBA
2013	"Birthday"	TBA
2013	"Oluwa ni sola"	TBA
2012	"Take banana"	"Solar Plexus"
2012	"Real G" (featuring MI)	TBA
2012	"Call Police"	"Frenzy"
2012	"Amarachi"	TBA
2010	"Jonzing World" (featuring Jesse Jagz & Wizkid)	Non-album single
2009	"Omoba"	Non-album single
2009	"I Like What I See" (featuring Wande Coal)	Non-album single
2009	"Ooze" (featuring Wande Coal & D'Banj)	Non-album single

== Collaborations ==
As lead artist
Year	Title	Artist	Album
2011	"Wad Up" (featuring D'Prince)	Wizkid	Superstar
2014	"Dorobucci" (featuring Don Jazzy, Tiwa Savage, Dr SID, Reekado Banks, Korede Bello, Di'Ja & D'Prince)	Mavin Records	TBA
2014	"Adaobi" (featuring Don Jazzy, Tiwa Savage, Dr SID, Reekado Banks, Korede Bello, Di'Ja & D'Prince)	Mavin Records	TBA
2014	"Looku Looku" (featuring Don Jazzy, Tiwa Savage, Dr SID, Reekado Banks, Korede Bello, Di'Ja & D'Prince)	Mavin Records	TBA

== Awards and recognition ==
=== Awards and nominations ===
Year	Awards ceremony	Category	Recipient	Results
2010	Nigeria Entertainment Awards	Best New Act of the Year	Himself	Nominated
2010	Nigeria Entertainment Awards	Most Promising Act to Watch	Himself	Nominated
2010	The Headies	Next Rated	Himself	Nominated
2011	The Headies	Best Pop Single	"Give It To Me" (feat. D'Banj)	Nominated
2011	The Headies	Song of the Year	"Give It To Me" (feat. D'Banj)	Nominated
2011	Nigeria Entertainment Awards	Hottest Single of the Year	"Give It To Me" (feat. D'Banj)	Nominated
2011	Channel O Music Video Awards	Most Gifted Video of the Year	"Molowo Noni" (by SAMKLEF) (feat. D'Prince, Wizkid, Ice Prince)	Nominated
2011	Channel O Music Video Awards	Most Gifted Duo, Group or Featuring Video	"Molowo Noni" (by SAMKLEF) (feat. D'Prince, Wizkid, Ice Prince)	Nominated
2013	The Headies	Best Pop Single	"Goody Bag"	Nominated
2013	The Headies	Hip Hop World Revelation of the Year	Frenzy!	Nominated
2013	Nigeria Music Video Awards	Best use of Costumes	"Goody Bag"	Nominated
2025	Grammy Awards	Best Global Music Album	Heis (by Rema)	Nominated

=== Recognition ===
On 21 December 2021, TurnTable listed D'Prince on its Power List as one of the industry power players of 2021.

On 9 November 2024, The Recording Academy recognises D'Prince for his contribution on Rema’s second studio album Heis.

== See also ==
- List of Nigerian musicians
