= Crayon (singer) =

Nigerian singer and songwriter

- Also known as: Crayonthis, Captain Hook
- Born: Charles Chibueze Chukwu; 8 July 1997 (age 28); Surulere, Lagos State, Nigeria
- Genres: Afrobeats
- Occupations: Singer; songwriter
- Instruments: Vocals, Keyboard
- Years active: 2019–present
- Labels: Mavin Records; Blowtime Entertainment

Charles Chibueze Chukwu (born 8 July 1997), professionally known as Crayon, is a Nigerian singer and songwriter. In 2019, he was signed to Mavin Records.

== Early life ==
Crayon was born in Orile Iganmu, a community in Surulere, a suburb in Lagos State. He hails from Ebonyi State. At age 7, he moved to Ojo, Lagos where he grew up in a family of four. For his secondary education, he attended Treasure Court College, in Ojo.

== Career ==
In May 2019, Crayon was signed to Blowtime Entertainment, an imprint of Mavin Records. On 12 July 2019, he released his debut EP Cray Cray.

On 19 March 2021, Crayon released the single "Jackpot" featuring Bella Shmurda, off his second EP Twelve A.M that was released on 26 March 2021. Crayon released the single "Ijo (Laba Laba)" on 6 July 2022, which peaked at number 5 on the Turntable Top 100 chart.

Crayon's debut album, Trench to Triumph, delves into his challenging upbringing in a crowded apartment with nine people and rise to success in the music industry. Crayon's musical talent was discovered by Mavin in-house producer Baby Fresh, even though Crayon did not share his music on social media at the time. He overcame a period of depression in 2015 after failing to gain admission to university. Crayon has spoken openly about overcoming drug addiction with the help of Baby Fresh.

=== Personal Struggles ===
In 2023, Crayon opened up about his struggles with drug addiction. In an interview, he revealed that the addiction had a profound impact on his mental health, leading to a psychiatric hospital stay after a breakdown outside his record label's office. He credited fellow artist Rema for stepping in during the crisis, which Crayon described as a critical moment in his life. Reflecting on this period, he stated that he had almost lost everything due to his addiction and that the experience was similar to that of fellow artist Mohbad. Crayon expressed gratitude for the support he received and referred to the incident as a turning point in his personal and professional life.

== Discography ==
=== Studio albums ===
List of studio albums, with selected details
Title	Album details		
Title	Album details	Trench to Triumph	Released: 21 July 2023; Label: Mavin Records, Blowtime Entertainment; Formats: Digital download, streaming

=== EPs ===
List of extended plays with selected details
Title	EP details
Cray Cray	Released: 12 July 2019; Label: Mavin Records, Blowtime Entertainment; Formats: Digital download, streaming
Twelve A.M	Released: 26 March 2021; Label: Mavin Records, Blowtime Entertainment; Formats: Digital download, streaming

=== Singles ===
==== As lead artist ====
Year	Title	Album
2020	"Kpano"	Non-album single
2020	"Shima"	Non-album single
2020	"Mo Bad"	Non-album single
2020	"On Code" (with. London)	Non-album single
2020	"Sometime"	Non-album single
2020	"Do Me"	Non-album single
2021	"Jackpot" (feat. Bella Shmurda)	Twelve A.M
2021	"Excuse me (Rock You)" (feat. Toby Shang)	Non-album single
2022	Ijo (Laba Laba)	Non-album single
2022	Ijo (Laba Laba)	—
2023	The One (Chop Life)	—
2023	Modupe	—
2023	Belle Full (with. Victony, KTIZO)	—
2024	FADE AWAY	—
2024	If I Be You	—

==== As featured artist ====
Year	Title	Album
2019	"Based on Kpa" (Ladipoe feat. Crayon)	Know You
2022	Overloading (Overdose) (Mavins, Crayon & Ayra Starr feat. Ladipoe, Magixx & Boy Spyce)	—
2023	Sunflawa (Cheque with. Crayon)	—
2023	Yo Fam! (Sarz feat. Crayon & Skrillex)	—
2023	OHEMA (with. Crayon & bella Shmurda)	—
2024	Away (Smallgod with. Kweku Flick, Crayon, Stunn)	—
2024	Reset (feat. Crayon & Bella Shmurda)	
2024	Trabaye (VASA feat.Crayon)	Book of Vasa Part 1

== Awards and nominations ==
Year	Ceremony	Award	Nominated work	Result	Ref
2019	The Headies	Rookie of the Year	Himself	Nominated	
