= Korede Bello =

Nigerian singer (born 1996)

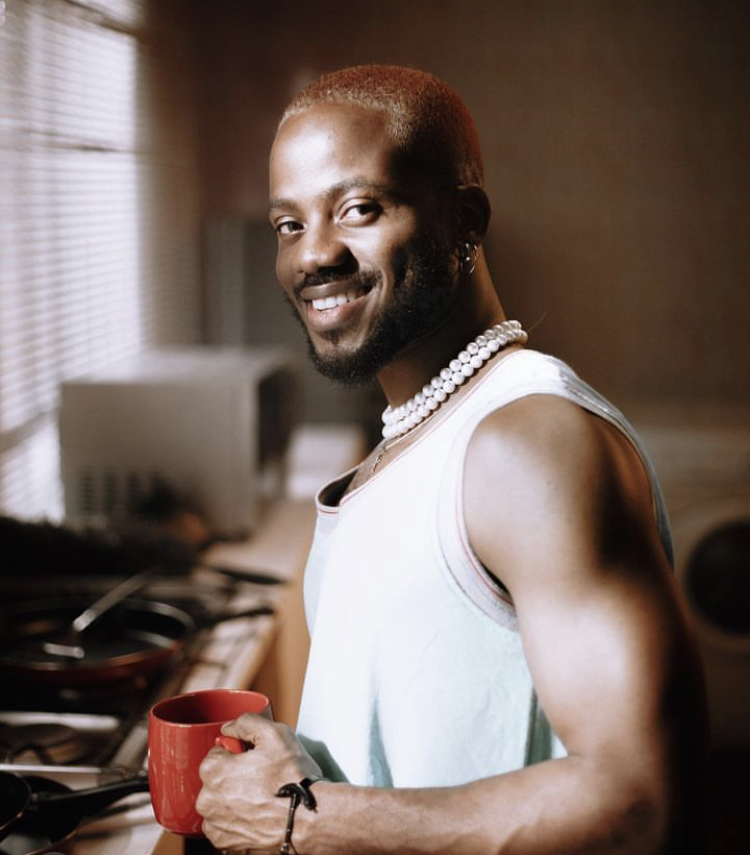
- Korede Bello in 2021 (Jeremy Visuals)

Background information
- Born: 29 February 1996 (age 30); Lagos State, Nigeria
- Genres: R&B, Afrobeats, hip hop, pop
- Occupations: Singer, songwriter
- Instrument: Guitar
- Years active: 2009–present
- Label: ONErpm. Mavin(former)
- Website: koredebello.com

Korede Bello (born 29 February 1996) is a Nigerian singer and songwriter. He signed a record deal with Mavin Records in 2014. Bello is best known for his hit single "Godwin", a semi-gospel and pop song which became a national anthem and topped many music charts across Nigeria.

== Early life ==
Korede (English:"Bring Fortune") was born in Lagos State, where he completed his primary and secondary school education. He is of the Yoruba ethnicity. He started performing at the age of 7 and went by the stage name African Prince.

== Career ==
While in primary school, Korede Bello went on to write his first song after forming a music group with a friend. He started music professionally by recording songs in the studio while in secondary school, and eventually released his first single "Forever". Korede released his debut album titled “Belloved” in 2017. In 2016 his hit song "Do Like That" was certified gold in Canada.

He studied Mass Communication at the Nigerian Institute of Journalism and holds a Higher National Diploma certificate. Korede Bello is an Associate Member of the Institute of Information Management.

=== Mavin Records deal ===
After the release of his first single which received relatively positive reviews, he was introduced to Don Jazzy by his manager Casmir Uwaegbute after which they recorded some songs together which got Don Jazzy impressed. On 28 February 2014, he got signed to Mavin Records under which he has recorded popular songs like "African Princess" and "Godwin". He exited the Mavin record label in 2021.

In 2021, Korede Bello was credited a Gold Certification Award from the Recording Industry Association of America (RIAA) for his hit single "Do Like That", which at the time became the highest-certified digital single of all time for him and the Label Mavin Records.

Also in 2022, he was awarded the Gold Award Certified in Canada.

=== Caspertainment ===
Korede bello released a new single “Available” under Caspertainment Agency in October 2022. In April 2023, he released a new song titled “Jejely” featuring Mr Eazi.

== Humanitarian work ==
Korede Bello has over time engaged in several humanitarian activities such as the Project Pink Blue Walk for Cancer awareness programme in Abuja, 2015 and 2017. Korede Bello is a Mental Health Advocate and his aim is to end mental health stigma and support young people living with mental illness.

=== Ambassador ===
In 2015 the Nigerian Police Force unveiled him as its first Youth Ambassador by Inspector General of Police IGP Solomon E. Arase. In 2018, Korede Bello was decorated as the Honorary Superintendent of Police by the IGP.

== Discography ==
=== Studio albums ===
- Belloved (2017)
- Koreday (2024)

EPs

- Table for Two (2020)
- M3GA Vibrations (2025)

=== Singles ===
| Title | Year | Release date |
|---|---|---|
| "4eva" | 2012 | 12 March 2012 |
| "African Princess" | 2014 | 28 February 2014 |
| "Dorobucci" (with Don Jazzy, Tiwa Savage, Dr SID, D'Prince, Reekado Banks and Di'Ja) | 2014 | 1 May 2014 |
| "Adaobi" (with Don Jazzy, Reekado Banks and Di'Ja) | 2014 | 27 May 2014 |
| "Cold Outside" | 2014 | 15 August 2014 |
| "Looku Looku" (with Don Jazzy, Tiwa Savage, Dr SID, D'Prince, Reekado Banks and Di'Ja) | 2014 | 31 October 2014 |
| "Jingle Bell" | 2014 | 25 December 2014 |
| "Godwin" | 2015 | 28 January 2015 |
| "Somebody Great" (with Asa) | 2015 | 30 September 2015 |
| "Jantamanta" (with Don Jazzy Tiwa Savage, Dr SID, D'Prince, Reekado Banks and Di'Ja) | 2015 | 27 October 2015 |
| "Romantic" (with Tiwa Savage) | 2015 | December 2015 |
| "Mungo Park" | 2016 | 7 May 2016 |
| "One & Only" | 2016 | 26 May 2016 |
| "Do Like That" | 2016 | 13 September 2016 |
| "Butterfly" | 2017 | 17 May 2017 |
| "Favorite Song" | 2017 | 11 March 2017 |
| "Let Him Go" | 2017 | 11 March 2017 |
| "Oh Baybe" | 2017 | 11 March 2017 |
| "Repete" | 2017 | 11 March 2017 |
| "If You Smile" | 2017 | 11 March 2017 |
| "Ese Baba" | 2017 | 11 March 2017 |
| "Young Presido" | 2017 | 11 March 2017 |
| "Good Time" | 2017 | 11 March 2017 |
| "My People (featuring Lil Kesh)" | 2017 | 1 September 2017 |
| "Melanin Popping" | 2018 | 18 January 2018 |
| "Work It" | 2018 | 5 May 2018 |
| "So te" | 2018 | 7 May 2018 |
| "2geda" | 2018 | 22 May 2018 |
| "Stamina" | 2018 | 20 September 2018 |
| "Champion" | 2018 | 29 September 2018 |
| "Bless Me" | 2018 | 30 September 2018 |
| "Mr. Vendor" | 2019 | 26 April 2019 |
| "Sun Momi (Only You)" | 2020 | 12 February 2020 |
| "Bella" | 2022 | 25 August 2022 |
| "Available" | 2022 | 8 November 2022 |
| "Jejely" | 2023 | 14 April 2023 |

== Selected awards and nominations ==
| Year | Award ceremony | Prize | Recipient/Nominated work | Result | Ref |
|---|---|---|---|---|---|
| 2014 | Nigeria Teen Choice Awards 2014 | Most Promising Music Act To Watch | Himself | Won | |
| 2015 | 4th Annual Golden Icons Academy Movie Awards | Best Song of the Year | "Godwin" | Won | |
| 2015 | 2015 Nigeria Entertainment Awards | Hottest Single of The Year | "Godwin" | Nominated | |
| 2015 | 2015 Nigeria Entertainment Awards | Best New Act | Himself | Nominated | |
| 2016 | The Headies 2015 | Best Pop Single | "Godwin" | Won | |
| 2016 | The Headies 2015 | Song of The Year | "Godwin" | Nominated | |
| 2016 | The Headies 2015 | Next Rated | Himself | Nominated | |
| 2016 | 2016 City People Entertainment Awards | Pop Artiste of the Year | Himself | Won | |
| 2016 | 2016 Nigeria Entertainment Awards | Best Collaboration | "Romantic" (featuring Tiwa Savage) | Nominated | |
| 2016 | 9th Nigeria Music Video Awards | Best Contemporary Afro Video | "Godwin" | Won | |

== See also ==
- List of Nigerian musicians
