= Magixx (singer) =

Nigerian singer and songwriter (born 1999)

- Born: Alexander Adelabu; 27 September 1999 (age 26); Lagos, Nigeria
- Genres: Afro-fusion, afro-pop
- Occupations: Singer; songwriter
- Instrument: Vocals
- Label: Mavin Records

Alexander Adelabu (born 27 September 1999), widely known as Magixx, is a Nigerian singer and songwriter. In 2021, he signed a recording deal with Mavin Records.

== Early life and education ==
Adelabu was born and brought up in Lagos State. He obtained a degree in Mass Communication from the University of Lagos. At age 12, he discovered passion for music. He grew up listening to Fela Kuti and DMX.

== Career ==
Magixx began singing in the choir at the age of 10. In 2019, he released his debut single "Problem". In September 2021, he signed with Mavin Records and went on to release his debut self-titled EP Magixx, that same year.

In February 2022, he released a new version of "Love Don't Cost a Dime" with Ayra Starr. The song debuted at number 27 on the TurnTableTop 50 chart, and peaked at number 8, on 28 March 2022. On 20 July 2022, he released "Shaye". The single serves as the lead single from his second EP ATOM, released on 22 July 2022. In 2023, Magixx released two-pack singles, "Colors (My Baby)" & "Loyal". In August August 2023, Magixx released the single "Maria". The song was produced by Louddaaa and received positive reviews.

In January 2025, Magixx announced his debut studio album titled I Dream In Color, which was officially released on February 28, 2025. The album features a guest appearance from Jeriq.

Upon release, I Dream In Color debuted at number one on the Nigeria Albums Chart, and peaked at number three on Boomplay Nigeria Top Albums within its first week.

== Discography ==
Studio albums

- I Dream in Color (2025)

EPs

- Magixx (2021)
- ATOM (2022)

== Awards and nominations ==
Year	Ceremony	Award	Nominated work	Result	Ref
2022	The Headies	Rookie of the Year	Himself	Nominated	
2023	The Headies	Best Vocal Performance (Male)	Love Don't Cost A Dime	Nominated	
