= Mavin Records =

Nigerian record label

- Type: Private (incorporated as a general partnership)
- Industry: Entertainment
- Genre: Various
- Founded: 8 May 2012; 14 years ago
- Founder: Don Jazzy
- Headquarters: Victoria Island, Lagos, Nigeria
- Area served: Worldwide
- Key people: Michael Collins Ajereh; Tega Oghenejobo
- Brands: Mavin Clothing Line Ltd
- Services: Mavin Energy Ltd; Mavin Real Estate, Inc; Mavin Films
- Parent: UMG; Mavin Global Holdings
- Website: www.mavinrecords.com

Mavin Records (also known as the Supreme Mavin Dynasty) is a Nigerian corporation and record label founded by record producer Don Jazzy on 8 May 2012. The label's inception came to fruition following the closure of Mo' Hits Records, a label jointly founded by Don Jazzy and D'banj. Mavin Records is home to recording artists such as Rema, Ayra Starr, Crayon, Johnny Drille, Ladipoe, Magixx, Boy Spyce, Bayanni, and Lifesize Teddy. It also houses producers such as Don Jazzy, Altims, London, Baby Fresh, and Andre Vibez. In 2014, DJ Big N became the label's official disc jockey. Artists formerly signed to the label include D'Prince, Tiwa Savage, Wande Coal, Reekado Banks, and Iyanya. Mavin Records released its debut compilation album, Solar Plexus, on 8 May 2012. Chapter X, the label's second compilation album, was released on 2 December 2022.

== History ==
=== 2012–2019: Founding, signings, and endorsement deals ===
Mavin Records started as a result of D'banj's departure from Mo' Hits. It was alleged that D'banj signed over Mo' Hits to Don Jazzy. In an interview with Sunday Punch, Don Jazzy addressed D'banj's departure from the label, saying, "We were working together, and all was going well. It got to a point where I looked at the situation and we both decided that it was not working, and we had to move on". Don Jazzy alluded to being hesitant about a name change. According to BellaNaija, the term "Mavin" describes someone who is gifted and skilled in any field. Mavin Records launched its official website and social networking site, the Mavin League, a day before its founding. After rebranding Mo' Hits to Mavin, Don Jazzy signed Nigerian singer Tiwa Savage in June 2012. In November that year, Pulse Nigeria reported that Mavin Records signed producers Aluko "Altims" Timothy and Sunday "BabyFresh" Enejere.

Don Jazzy signed endorsement deals with Samsung and Loya Milk after establishing the label; Savage also signed an endorsement deal with Pepsi. Within a year of becoming a revamped brand, Mavin Records released "Take Banana" and "Oma Ga" as singles from its debut compilation album, Solar Plexus. In February 2014, Don Jazzy signed Di'Ja, Reekado Banks and Korede Bello to Mavin Records within a week of one another. On 1 May 2014, Mavin Records released the hit single "Dorobucci" to critical acclaim. On February 25, 2015, both Don Jazzy and Savage signed endorsement deals with Konga.com. On 31 October 2016, several media outlets in Nigeria reported that Iyanya signed a record deal with Mavin Records; both Iyanya and Don Jazzy confirmed the report on Instagram. On 28 February 2017, Don Jazzy announced the signings of Johnny Drille, Ladipoe, and DNA to Mavin Records. In January 2019, the label secured a multi-million dollars investment from Kupanda Holdings, a subsidiary of Kupanda Capital and TPG Growth. Rema's record deal with Mavin Records was announced in March 2019. Two months later, the label unveiled the signing of Crayon and released the collaborative single "All is in Order" the following day.

=== 2020–present: Chapter X and UMG Acquisition ===
In 2020, Billboard magazine named Mavin Records one of the gatekeepers of the Nigerian music industry. On January 21, 2021, the label unveiled the signing of Ayra Starr. In December 2022, Mavin Records announced plans to hold an all-star concert and release its second compilation album, Chapter X. The album was executively produced by Don Jazzy and commemorates the label's 10-year anniversary. Chapter X comprises ten tracks and was released on 2 December 2022. The label's all-star concert, which occurred at the annual Livespot X Festival, was held on 16 December 2022. In February 2024, Universal Music Group acquired a majority share in Mavin Records. In October of the previous year, Billboard magazine revealed that Shot Tower Capital had valued the label above $125 million. Under the terms of the new deal, Don Jazzy and Tega Oghenejobo will continue to serve as the label's CEO and COO, respectively.

== Departures ==
=== Wande Coal ===
Reports about Wande Coal's departure surfaced after he released and promoted the single "Kilaju" without the support of Mavin Records. On 5 November 2013, Wande Coal released the single "Baby Face" and said Shizzi produced it for him. Shortly after the song's release, Don Jazzy accused Wande Coal of intellectual property theft. He uploaded a studio demo of "Baby Face", which was supposedly recorded the previous year. Wande Coal debunked Jazzy's accusations against him and tweeted a link to the "original" version. In an interview with Premium Times newspaper, entertainment lawyer Demilade Olaosun spoke about the incident. Olaosun said Mavin Records owned the intellectual property because the song was produced, orchestrated, and voiced by an employee of the label. The lawyer also stated that since Wande Coal's recording contract was not made available to the public, speculations cannot be made about the song's intellectual property. Mavin Records formally announced Wande Coal's departure in a press release dated 7 November 2013. The press statement was issued not long after Don Jazzy and Wande Coal's Twitter feud.

=== Iyanya, Reekado Banks, Tiwa Savage, and D'Prince ===
In a radio interview with Beat FM in February 2018, Iyanya announced his exit from Mavin Records, saying, "I'm now signed to Temple Music, but I'm a Mavin for life. It was not a beef. I was there, and it was time to move on". On 7 December 2018, Reekado Banks announced his departure from Mavin Records and launch of his independent outfit, Banks Music. In May 2019, Universal Music Group announced the signing of Tiwa Savage. During the announcement, it was revealed that Savage left Mavin Records. Don Jazzy congratulated Savage on her UMG signing and said she will forever be remembered at Mavin. On 9 May 2020, Guardian Life Magazine reported that D'Prince exited the label following the expiration of his eight-year contract; he established Jonzing World prior to leaving. In an interview with Ifeanyi Ibeh on Twitter, D'Prince said, "My record deal with Mavin Records ended on 8 May 2020, and it has been an amazing 16 years under my brother Don Jazzy".

== Accolades ==
Year	Awards ceremony	Award description(s)	Results	Ref
2014	City People Entertainment Awards	Best Record Label of the Year	Won	
2013	City People Entertainment Awards	Best Record Label of the Year	Nominated	
2024	TurnTable Music Awards	Outstanding Achievement in Creative Direction in Music	Won	

== Artists ==
=== Current acts ===
Act	Year signed	Releases under the label
Dr SID	2012	1
Ladipoe	2017	2
Johnny Drille	2017	4
DNA	2017	1
Rema	2019	7
Ayra Starr	2021	4
Magixx	2021	3
Boy Spyce	2022	1
Bayanni	2022	2
Lifesize Teddy	2023	2

=== Former acts ===
Act	Year signed	Year left	Releases under the label
D'Prince	2012	2020	2
Tiwa Savage	2012	2019	3
Wande Coal	2012	2013	—
Reekado Banks	2014	2018	1
Iyanya	2016	2017	1
Korede Bello	2014	2022	1
Di'Ja	2014	2023	2

== Producers ==
=== Current producers ===
- Don Jazzy
- Altims
- Babyfresh
- London
- Andre Vibez

=== DJ's ===
- DJ Big N

== Discography ==
=== Albums ===
Artist	Album	Details
The Mavins	Solar Plexus	Released: 8 May 2012; Chart Position: —; Certification: —
D'Prince	Frenzy!	Released: 5 November 2012; Chart Position: —; Certification: —
Tiwa Savage	Once Upon a Time	Released: 3 July 2013; Chart Position: —; Certification: —
Dr SID	Siduction	Released: 20 December 2013; Chart Position: —; Certification: —
Tiwa Savage	R.E.D	Released: 19 December 2015; Chart Position: —; Certification: —
Reekado Banks	Spotlight	Released: 1 September 2016: Chart Position: 10 (Billboard's World Album chart); Certification: —
Korede Bello	Belloved	Released: 11 March 2017: Chart Position: —; Certification: —
Iyanya	Signature (EP)	Released: 28 March 2017: Chart Position: —; Certification: —
Tiwa Savage	Sugarcane (EP)	Released: 22 September 2017: Chart Position: —; Certification: —
Di'Ja	Aphrodija (EP)	Released: 15 December 2017: Chart Position: —; Certification: —
Poe	T.A.P	Released: 5 October 2018: Chart Position: —; Certification: —
Rema	Rema (EP)	Released: 22 March 2019: Chart Position: —; Certification: —
D'Prince	Lavida (EP)	Released: 3 May 2019: Chart Position: —; Certification: —
Rema	Rema Freestyle (EP)	Released: 17 June 2019: Chart Position: —; Certification: —
Di'Ja	Di'Ja (EP)	Released: 5 July 2019: Chart Position: —; Certification: —
Ayra Starr	Ayra Starr (EP)	Released; 22 January 2021: Chart Position: —; Certification: —
Ayra Starr	19 & Dangerous	Released: 6 August 2021: Chart Position: —; Certification: —
Magixx	Magixx (EP)	Released: 24 September 2021: Chart Position: --; Certification: --
Boy Spyce	Boy Spyce (EP)	Released: 15 April 2022: Chart Position: --; Certification: --
Magixx	Atom (EP)	Released: 22 July 2022: Chart Position: --; Certification: --
Bayanní	Bayanni (EP)	Released: 24 August 2022: Chart Position: --; Certification: --
The Mavins	Chapter X	Released: 2 December 2022: Chart Position: --; Certification: --
Lifesize Teddy	Lifesize Teddy (EP)	Released: 9 August 2023: Chart Position: --; Certification: --
Rema	Rave & Roses Ultra	Released: 27 August 2023: Chart Position: --; Certification: --
Rema	Ravage (EP)	Released: 26 October 2023: Chart Position: --; Certification: --
Lifesize Teddy	Poisn (EP)	Released: 21 November 2023: Chart Position: --; Certification: --

=== Singles ===
`List of singles released by artists signed to Mavin Records
Artist	Title	Year	Album	Release date
D'Prince	"Take Banana"	2012	Solar Plexus	—N/a
Tiwa Savage	"Oma Ga"	2012	Solar Plexus	—N/a
D'Prince	"Take Banana" (Remix)	2012	Frenzy	31 October 2012
D'Prince	"Real G" (featuring M.I)	2012	Frenzy	31 October 2012
D'Prince	"Goody Bag"	2012	Frenzy	31 October 2012
D'Prince	"Call Police"	2012	Frenzy	31 October 2012
Wande Coal	"The Kick" (featuring Don Jazzy)	2013	Non-album single	23 January 2014
Wande Coal	"Rotate"	2013	Non-album single	26 April 2013
Dr SID	"Lady Don Dada"	2013	Siduction	2 May 2013
Dr SID	"Love Mine"	2013	Siduction	5 May 2013
D'Prince	"Birthday"	2013	Non-album single	6 May 2013
Dr SID	"Talented"	2013	Siduction	12 May 2013
Dr SID	"Baby Tornado"	2013	Siduction	21 August 2013
Tiwa Savage	"Eminado"	2013	Once Upon a Time	8 October 2013
Dr SID	"Surulere"	2013	Siduction	13 November 2013
D'Prince	"Gentlemen" (featuring Davido and Don Jazzy)	2014	Non-album single	27 January 2014
Di'Ja	"Yaro"	2014	Non-album single	14 February 2014
Reekado Banks	"Turn It Up" (featuring Tiwa Savage)	2014	Non-album single	21 February 2014
Korede Bello	"African Princess"	2014	Non-album single	28 February 2014
D'Prince	"Ojoro Cancel" (featuring Wizkid)	2014	Non-album single	7 March 2014
The Mavins	"Dorobucci" (featuring Don Jazzy, Tiwa Savage, Dr SID, D'Prince, Reekado Banks, Korede Bello and Di'Ja)	2014	Non-album single	1 May 2014
Dr SID and Don Jazzy	"Highlife Dorobucci"	2014	Non-album single	2 May 2014
The Mavins	"Adaobi" (Reekado Banks, Korede Bello and Di'Ja featuring Don Jazzy)	2014	Non-album single	27 May 2014
Di'Ja	"Yaro" (Remix) (featuring Ice Prince)	2014	Non-album single	29 July 2014
Reekado Banks	"Chop Am"	2014	Non-album single	8 August 2014
Korede Bello	"Cold Outside"	2014	Non-album single	15 August 2014
D'Prince	"Oyo"	2014	Non-album single	5 September 2014
The Mavins	"Arise" (featuring Don Jazzy, Reekado Banks and Di'Ja)	2014	Non-album single	20 September 2014
Tiwa Savage	"My Darlin"	2014	Non-album single	8 October 2014
The Mavins	"Looku Looku"	2014	Non-album single	31 October 2014
Di'Ja	"Awww"	2014	Non-album single	12 December 2014
D'Prince	"Oga Titus"	2014	Non-album single	23 December 2014
Korede Bello	"Jingle Bell"	2014	Non-album single	25 December 2014
Korede Bello	"Godwin"	2015	Non-album single	28 January 2015
Reekado Banks	"Katapot"	2015	Non-album single	14 February 2015
D'Prince	"Nonso" (featuring Reekado Banks)	2015	Non-album single	16 March 2015
Godywn (Note: Although Godywn worked with Don Jazzy and Di'Ja, he is not signed to Mavin Records.)	"Promise" (featuring Di'Ja)	2015	Non-album single	27 March 2015
Dr SID	"Chop Ogbono" (Remix) (featuring Olamide)	2015	Non-album single	5 May 2015
Di'Ja	"Amen"	2015	Non-album single	29 June 2015
Reekado Banks	"Corner"	2015	Non-album single	9 July 2015
Reekado Banks	"Sugar Baby"	2015	Non-album single	10 July 2015
Reekado Banks	"Tomorrow"	2015	Non-album single	11 July 2015
Dr SID	"Kabiyesi"	2015	Non-album single	6 August 2015
D'Prince	"Kwolity"	2015	Non-album single	21 August 2015
Korede Bello	"Somebody Great" (featuring Aṣa)	2015	Non-album single	29 September 2016
Di'Ja	"Falling For You" (featuring Patoranking)	2015	Non-album single	2 October 2015
D'Prince	"Bestie" (featuring Don Jazzy and Baby Fresh)	2015	Non-album single	16 November 2015
D'Prince	"Tarity" (featuring Phyno)	2015	Non-album single	25 November 2015
Tiwa Savage	"Standing Ovation" (featuring Olamide)	2016	R.E.D	14 January 2016
Reekado Banks	"Oluwa Ni"	2016	Non-album single	15 January 2016
Di'Ja	"Take Kiss" (featuring Baby Fresh)	2016	Non-album single	25 January 2016
Tiwa Savage	"Bad" (featuring Wizkid)	2016	R.E.D	22 March 2016
DJ Big N	"Erima" (featuring Dr SID and Wizkid)	2016	Non-album single	26 March 2016
Reekado Banks	"Machinery" (Dice Ailes Cover)	2016	Non-album single	7 April 2016
Johnny Drille	"Romeo & Juliet"	2017	Non-album single	14 July 2017
Johnny Drille	"Awa Love"	2018	Non-album single	9 February 2018
Johnny Drille	"Halleluya" (featuring Simi)	2018	Non-album single	23 July 2018
The Mavins	"All Is In Order" (featuring Don Jazzy, Rema, Korede Bello, DNA, and Crayon)	2019	Non-album single	31 May 2019
Rema	"Spiderman"	2019	Freestyle EP	19 June 2019
Rema	"Trap Out the Submarine"	2019	Freestyle EP	19 June 2019
Rema	"Bad Commando"	2019	Bad Commando	4 October 2019
Rema	"Lady"	2019	Bad Commando	11 November 2019
Rema	"Corny"	2019	Rema Compilation	24 March 2019
Rema	"Beamer (Bad Boys)" (with Rvssian)	2020	Rema Compilation	21 February 2020
Rema	"Ginger Me"	2020	Rema Compilation	19 June 2020
Rema	"Woman"	2020	Rema Compilation	11 November 2020
Rema	"Bounce"	2021	—N/a	February 26, 2021
Rema	"Soundgasm"	2021	Rave & Roses	June 11, 2021
Ayra Starr	"Bloody Samaritan"	2021	19 & Dangerous	30 July 2021
Rema	"Calm Down"	2022	Rave & Roses	February 11, 2022
Rema	"FYN" (with AJ Tracey)	2022	Rave & Roses	March 11, 2022
Magixx	"Love Don't Cost A Dime (Re-Up)" (with Ayra Starr)	2022	TBD	February 9, 2022
Magixx	"Chocolate"	2022	TBD	March 2, 2022
Ayra Starr	"Stars"	2022	TBD	May 6, 2022
Ayra Starr	"Ase - A Colors Show"	2022	TBD	June 6, 2022
Ladipoe	"Big Energy"	2022		June 10, 2022
Magixx	"Shaye"	2022	Atom	July 20, 2022
Ayra Starr	"Rush"	2022	19 & Dangerous	September 16, 2022
Johnny Drille	"How are You (My Friend)"	2022	TBD	October 12, 2022
