= Ladipoe =

Nigerian rapper

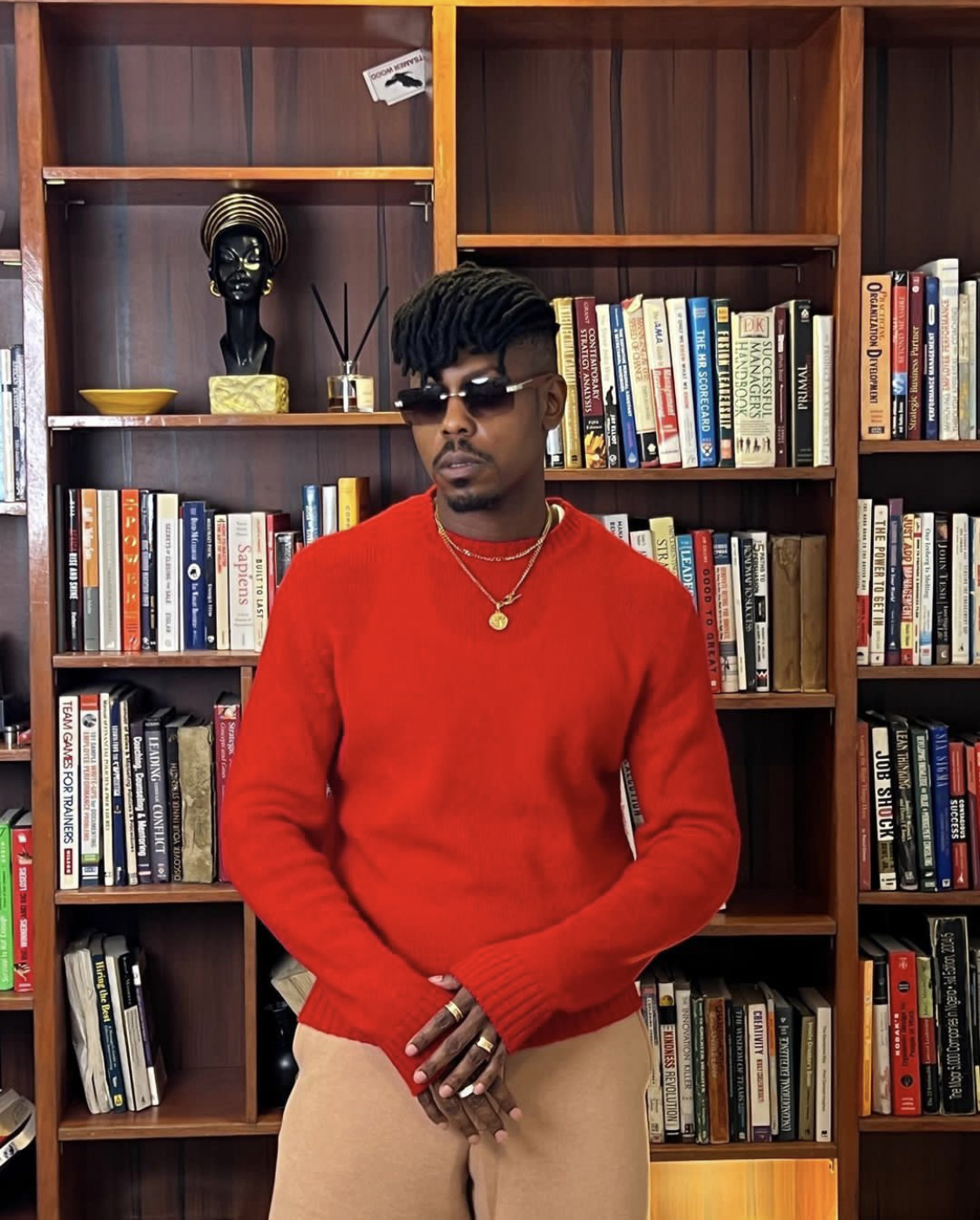

Background information
- Also known as: Poe; Leader of the Revival
- Born: Ladipo Eso; 25 April 1985 (age 41)
- Origin: Ilesa, Osun State, Nigeria
- Genres: Afro pop; Afrobeats
- Occupations: Singer; songwriter; rapper; pianist
- Instruments: Vocals, Piano
- Years active: 2014–present
- Label: Mavin Records
- Website: ladipoe.com

Ladipo Eso (born 25 April 1985), known professionally as Ladipoe and formerly as Poe, is a Nigerian rapper and singer. On 28 February 2017, Ladipoe signed a record deal with Mavin Records. He gained prominence following his feature on the song "Feel Alright" by Show Dem Camp. In March 2019, he also released the single "Jaiye" before releasing "Know You" featuring Simi. He is also a member of the Nigerian supergroup Collectiv3, and he is known by the alias "Leader of the New Revival".

== Early life and education ==
Ladipoe was born and raised in Lagos on 25 April 1985. He attended the University of North Carolina at Pembroke, where he studied biology and chemistry. While there, he became interested in music and co-founded the group Lyrically Equipped with his friends Jeffrey and Kurt. In 2017, he signed with Mavin Records under Don Jazzy in 2017.

== Career ==
Ladipoe was the first rapper signed to Mavin Records following the label's rebranding from Mo'Hits Records in 2012. His first single under the label "Man Already", was produced by Altims. Ladipoe is inspired by the Slum Village, Lupe and Little Brother.

His 2021 single, "Feeling", featuring Bnxn, peaked at number one on the TurnTable Top 50 chart on three occasions. He performed the song at the opening show of the sixth season of Big Brother Naija.

In a November 2021 interview with The Guardian Nigeria, Ladipoe discussed building a rap career in an environment where the genre was less appreciated. He stated that he had been told rap music had lost relevance in Nigeria before releasing "Feeling", featuring Bnxn. He has also reflected on his struggles in the music industry and attributed his success to his faith.

== Discography ==
=== Singles ===
- "Know you" feat Simi (2020)
- "Rap Messiah" (2021)
- "Feeling" feat Buju (2021)
- "Big Energy" (2022)
- "Guy Man" feat Bella Shmurda (2023)
- “Halleluja" (2024)

=== Albums ===
- Talk About Poe (2019)
- Providence (2021)
- Revival (2026)

== Awards and nominations ==
Year	Award	Category	Work	Result	Ref
2020	The Headies	Best Collaboration	"Know You" featuring Simi	Won	
2021	Net Honours	Most Played Hip Hop Song	"Know You" featuring Simi	Nominated	
2021	BET Hip-Hop Awards	Best International Flow	Himself	Nominated	
2022	The Headies 2022	Best Rap Single	"Feeling" (featuring Bnxn)	Won	
2023	The Headies	Lyricist on the Roll	"Clowns"	Nominated	

== See also ==
- List of Nigerian rappers
