= Greatness III =

Studio album by DJ Neptune
- Released: 6 September 2024
- Genres: Afrobeats; Amapiano; R&B; dancehall; hip-hop
- Length: 35:22
- Labels: Neptune Records; Greatness Republik; emPawa Africa
- Producers: DJ Neptune (exec.); Kolade Dominate (exec.); Reward Beatz; Timbun; OG Sterling; Dummex; Kukbeatz; Axon; Choke Boi

DJ Neptune chronology
Greatness 2.0 (2021)	Greatness III (2024)	Greatness IV (2025)

Singles from Greatness III
- 1. "Bienvenue" Released: 1 February 2023; 2. "Mumu" Released: 11 October 2023; 3. "Honest" Released: 28 August 2024

Greatness III is the third studio album by Nigerian disc jockey DJ Neptune. It was released on 6 September 2024 by Neptune Records, and Greatness Republik, through emPawa Africa. The album features guest appearances from artists including Ice Prince, Magnito, N6, Young Lunya, Khaligraph Jones, Ajebo Hustlers, Joeboy, Qing Madi, Erigga, Shoday, Soundz, Olivetheboy, Ayanfe, Joshua Baraka, L.A.X, Kidd Carder, Ruger, Bruce Melodie and Bayanni.

Greatness III is mixture of Afrobeats, Amapiano, R&B, hip-hop, and dancehall. The album was executive produced by DJ Neptune, and Kolade Dominate, as co-executive producer with additional production from Reward Beatz, Timbun, OG Sterling, Dummex, Kukbeatz, Axon, and Choke Boi.

== Background and release ==
Greatness III is the third instalment in DJ Neptune's Greatness album series, following Greatness (2018) and Greatness 2.0 (2021).

The album's release campaign began with "Mumu", featuring Joeboy, which was issued as a single ahead of the album. The song was followed by "Bienvenue", featuring Ruger, as the second lead single off the album.

DJ Neptune subsequently released "Honest", featuring Qing Madi, ahead of the album's arrival. The song was released on 16 August 2024 and was included on the final track listing. A music video for "Honest" followed on 10 September 2024, shortly after the album's release.

== Composition ==
The album opens with "Normal Day", featuring Ice Prince, Magnito, N6, Young Lunya and Khaligraph Jones. The track combines Nigerian hip-hop with Afro-drill influences and brings together artists from different African music scenes. "Too Much", featuring Ajebo Hustlers, follows with an Amapiano-influenced production and a more dance-oriented approach.

"Mumu", featuring Joeboy, is a romantic Afropop track centred on infatuation and emotional attachment. "Honest", featuring Qing Madi, takes a more reflective approach, with the two artists addressing uncertainty and emotional distance in a relationship.

"Ou LaLa", featuring Savage and Erigga, blends Afropop and hip-hop elements, while "Dorime", featuring Shoday, adopts a more contemporary, dance-focused sound. "Wait For You", featuring Soundz, shifts toward an R&B-influenced style, with the song focusing on romantic anticipation and commitment.

"Emmanuella", featuring Olivetheboy, continues the album's romantic themes, while "Damo (Recognise)", featuring Ayanfe, incorporates Afropop elements. "Tonight", featuring Ugandan singer Joshua Baraka, introduces a stronger dancehall influence and expands the album's collaborative scope beyond Nigeria.

"Body", featuring L.A.X, is built around an Afropop groove, while "Shayo", featuring Kidd Carder, takes a more celebratory approach. "Bienvenue", featuring Ruger, combines Afrobeats with dancehall influences and centres on attraction and nightlife. The album closes with "Forever", featuring Rwandan singer Bruce Melodie and Nigerian singer Bayanni, a melodic collaboration that returns to the project's romantic themes.

== Reception ==
Greatness III received generally favourable but mixed critical commentary. Reviewing for Album Talks, TJ Martins praised the project for its cohesion and variety, while noting that some of its Amapiano-influenced production appeared less suited to particular featured artists.

NotJustOk described the album as a diverse collection of collaborations and noted DJ Neptune's role not only as a record producer but also as an A&R figure in bringing together artists from different musical backgrounds. Rolling Stone Africa writer Takudzwa Nyambi, describes the album as a statement that the future of African music is here—and Neptune is, as always, a key player.

== Track listing ==
Greatness III track listing
No.	Title	Producer(s)	Length
1.	"Normal Day" (with Ice Prince, and Magnito) (feat. N6, Young Lunya and Khaligraph Jones)	Timbun	3:20
2.	"Too Much" (with Ajebo Hustlers)	Timbun	2:36
3.	"Mumu" (with Joeboy)	Timbun	2:53
4.	"Honest" (with Qing Madi)	Reward Beatz	2:41
5.	"Ou LaLa" (with Savage and Erigga)	OG Sterling; Dummex	2:24
6.	"Dorime" (with Shoday)	Timbun	2:25
7.	"Wait For You" (with Soundz)	Timbun	2:43
8.	"Emmanuella" (with Olivetheboy)	Reward Beatz	2:15
9.	"Damo (Recognise)" (with Ayanfe)	Reward Beatz	2:17
10.	"Tonight" (featuring Joshua Baraka)	Axon; Timbun	1:48
11.	"Body" (with L.A.X)	Timbun	2:26
12.	"Shayo" (with Kidd Carder)	Reward Beatz	2:27
13.	"Bienvenue" (with Ruger)	Choke Boi; Kukbeatz	2:56
14.	"Forever" (with Bruce Melodie and Bayanni)	Reward Beatz	2:11
Total length:			35:22
