= Greatness 2.0 =

Studio album by DJ Neptune
- Released: 26 November 2021
- Genres: Afrobeats; Afropop; Amapiano; Hip-hop; Dancehall; Afro-soul; Afro fusion; Bongo flava; Street pop
- Length: 49:00
- Label: Neptune Records
- Producers: Magicsticks, MOG, Dëra, Andre Vibez, Yung Willis, Sess, Fancy Beatz, DJ Krept, Speroach Beatz

DJ Neptune chronology
Love and Greatness (2019)	Greatness 2.0 (2021)	Greatness III (2024)

Singles from Greatness 2.0
- 1. "Nobody" Released: 5 March 2020; 2. "Gaza" Released: 24 September 2021

Greatness 2.0 is the second studio album by Nigerian disc jockey DJ Neptune. It was released on 26 November 2021 by Neptune Records, through emPawa Africa. The album features guest appearances from Rema, Joeboy, Mr Eazi, Omah Lay, Adekunle Gold, Phyno, Simi, Peruzzi, Patoranking, Focalistic, Stonebwoy, Yemi Alade, Harmonize, Laycon, Waje, Ladipoe, Blaqbonez, Cheque, Bella Shmurda, Lojay, Zlatan, Jeriq, Kofi Jamar, Anjella and One Acen.

== Background ==
Following the release of his debut studio album Greatness in 2018, DJ Neptune began work on its follow-up. He said the project was initially planned for release in 2020, but the COVID-19 pandemic caused him to return to the studio, record new material and rethink the album's direction.

Neptune described Greatness 2.0 as an expansion of the concept established on Greatness. Rather than focusing primarily on Nigerian artists, he sought to make a broader pan-African project that incorporated sounds and artists from different parts of the continent. He cited Focalistic's representation of South Africa's amapiano, Harmonize and Anjella's East African influence, and Stonebwoy's Ghanaian sound as examples of the album's wider scope.

The album followed the success of "Nobody", featuring Joeboy and Mr Eazi, which was ranked as the number-one song on the TurnTable End of the Year Top 50 for 2020.

== Release and promotion ==
The album was announced in November 2021, with Pulse Nigeria reporting that it would be released on 26 November through Neptune Records and emPawa Africa. The announcement highlighted the project's large roster of African collaborators. Several songs from the project were released or promoted ahead of the album. "Nobody", featuring Joeboy and Mr Eazi, had been released in March 2020. "Gaza", featuring Patoranking, was released in September 2021 and was identified as part of the forthcoming Greatness 2.0 project.

The release was also accompanied by promotional appearances and interviews in which Neptune discussed the album's pan-African direction. In an interview with Pan African Music, he said he was deliberate about the collaborations and wanted the project to expand his reach beyond Nigeria.

Following the release of the album, "For You", featuring Rema, drew additional attention after Rema publicly questioned its release without his approval. Neptune subsequently stated that permission had been obtained from Rema's management before the album's release, while Rema's manager later issued a statement addressing the dispute.

== Critical reception ==
Professional ratings
Review scores
Source	Rating
Pulse Nigeria	8/10

Greatness 2.0 received generally positive reviews from Nigerian music publications. Writing for Pulse Nigeria, Motolani Alake praised Neptune's role as curator and executive producer, describing the album as a cohesive, playlist-like project despite its large number of collaborators.

PAPER Magazine described the album as a 16-track project built around a broad range of contemporary Afrobeats influences.

== Track listing ==
Greatness 2.0 track listing
No.	Title	Length
1.	"Rise Up" (with Laycon, Waje and Ladipoe)	4:31
2.	"Do and Undo" (with Mr Eazi)	2:59
3.	"Cupid" (with Blaqbonez and Cheque)	2:50
4.	"For You" (with Rema)	3:12
5.	"Gaza" (with Patoranking)	2:48
6.	"Ololufe" (with Simi and Peruzzi)	3:07
7.	"Hustle" (with Focalistic)	3:43
8.	"Love Potion" (with Adekunle Gold)	2:47
9.	"Abeg" (with Joeboy and Omah Lay)	2:39
10.	"Only Fan" (with Lojay) (feat. Zlatan)	3:21
11.	"On God" (with Bella Shmurda)	2:41
12.	"Cash" (with Kofi Jamar and Jeriq)	2:58
13.	"Recipe" (with Phyno)	2:19
14.	"Shitto" (with Stonebwoy, Yemi Alade and One Acen)	3:30
15.	"My Woman" (with Harmonize and Anjella)	3:10
16.	"Nobody" (with Joeboy and Mr Eazi)	2:27

== Personnel ==
- Imohiosen Patrick – executive producer
- Magicsticks – producer
- MOG – producer
- Dëra – producer
- Andre Vibez – producer
- Yung Willis – producer
- Sess – producer
- Fancy Beatz – producer
- DJ Krept – producer
- Speroach Beatz – producer
