= Greatness IV =

2025 studio album by DJ Neptune

Studio album by DJ Neptune
- Released: 25 September 2025
- Genres: Afrobeats; Amapiano; Street pop; Soukous; Gh hip-hop; Bongo flava
- Length: 36:14
- Labels: Neptune Records; Greatness Republik; emPawa Africa
- Producers: DJ Neptune; Timbun; Ugly x Tough; NYRP; Yo X

DJ Neptune chronology
Greatness III (2024)	Greatness IV (2025)

Singles from Greatness IV
- 1. "Dance No Dance" Released: 18 September 2025; 2. "Jeje Laye" Released: 22 September 2025

Greatness IV is the fourth studio album by Nigerian disc jockey and record producer DJ Neptune. It was released on 25 September 2025 by Neptune Records, and Greatness Republik, through emPawa Africa. The album features appearances from Reehaa, Kabusa Oriental Choir, Rybeena, Moelogo, LAZ, Dëra, Berri-Tiga, Timi Martins, SHON, LYRXX, Swayvee, Hotkeed, Portable, Guchi, KOJOBLAK, Kikimoteleba and Gbolar Mighty. Greatness IV was executive produced by DJ Neptune, and Kolade Dominate, as co-executive producer with additional production from Timbun, Ugly x Tough, NYRP, and Yo X.

Greatness IV is primarily an Afrobeats album that incorporates elements of Amapiano, Street pop, Soukous, Gh hip-hop, and Bongo flava.

== Background and release ==
Ahead of the album's release, DJ Neptune spoke about his approach to the project and his intention to bring together established and emerging artists.

Neptune released "Dance No Dance", featuring Swayvee, as the first lead single of the project on 18 September 2025, and it was accompanied by an official music video. "Jeje Laye", featuring Nigerian street-pop artist Portable, was the second lead single released on 22 September 2025.

The album was accompanied by promotional activities in Lagos, including a listening event held ahead of its release.

== Composition ==
The album opens with "Amin", featuring Reehaa and Kabusa Oriental Choir. The song combines contemporary Afrobeats with choral and spiritual elements, establishing the project's reflective opening. It is followed by "Katampe", featuring Rybeena, which shifts the album towards a contemporary romantic and melodic sound. "Come With Me", featuring Moelogo, incorporates Afro-piano elements and centres on romantic themes. "Money I Get", featuring LAZ and Dëra, takes a more contemporary street-oriented approach, while "My Girl", featuring Berri-Tiga, returns to the album's romantic themes.

The sixth track, "Halima", features Timi Martins and SHON. The song continues the album's melodic approach before "No Kiss And Tell", featuring LYRXX, introduces another romantic-themed performance. "Dance No Dance", featuring Swayvee, shifts the album towards a more dance-oriented sound. "Never Settle For Less", featuring Hotkeed, focuses on perseverance and aspiration. The song is followed by "Jeje Laye", featuring Portable, which brings the street-pop influence of the project to the forefront.

The eleventh track, "Running", features Guchi and continues the project's melodic and contemporary Afrobeats approach. "Taliban", featuring Ghanaian singer KOJOBLAK, incorporates Ghanaian musical influences and represents one of the album's strongest cross-border collaborations. According to an interview with Notjustok, "Taliban" was recorded in Accra, Ghana, while most of the album's other tracks were recorded in Lagos. "Good Mood Good Vibe", featuring Kikimoteleba, returns to the album's upbeat and celebratory side. The song is followed by the closing track, "Street", featuring Gbolar Mighty, which incorporates themes associated with Nigerian street culture and everyday urban life. Together, the final two songs close the album on an energetic note.

== Track listing ==
Greatness IV track listing
No.	Title	Producer(s)	Length
1.	"Amin" (with Reehaa and Kabusa Oriental Choir)	Timbun; DJ Neptune	2:55
2.	"Katampe" (with Rybeena)	Timbun; DJ Neptune	2:38
3.	"Come With Me" (with Moelogo)	NYRP	3:35
4.	"Money I Get" (with LAZ and Dëra)	Timbun	2:27
5.	"My Girl" (with Berri-Tiga)	Yo X; Timbun	2:31
6.	"Halima" (with Timi Martins and SHON)	Timbun	2:34
7.	"No Kiss And Tell" (with LYRXX)	Timbun	2:17
8.	"Dance No Dance" (with Swayvee)	DJ Neptune; Timbun	2:16
9.	"Never Settle For Less" (with Hotkeed)	Timbun	2:10
10.	"Jeje Laye" (with Portable)	Timbun	3:01
11.	"Running" (with Guchi)	Timbun	2:25
12.	"Taliban" (with KOJOBLAK)	Ugly x Tough	2:04
13.	"Good Mood Good Vibe" (with Kikimoteleba)	Timbun	2:31
14.	"Street" (with Gbolar Mighty)	Timbun	2:50
Total length:			36:14
