= Jamopyper =

Nigerian singer-songwriter

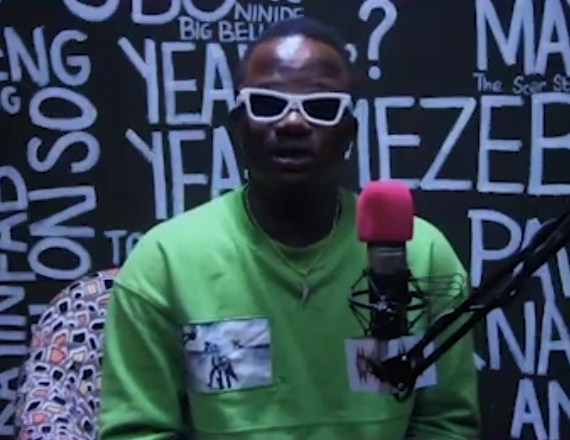

Background information
- Born: Jamiu Damilare Tajudeen; 25 October 1995 (age 30); Egbeda, Lagos, Nigeria
- Genres: Afrobeats; Hip Hop; Nigerian Alté
- Occupations: Rapper; Singer; Songwriter; Dancer
- Instrument: Vocals

Jamiu Damilare Tajudeen (born 25 October 1995), known professionally as Jamopyper, is a Nigerian singer and songwriter. He signed a record deal with Zlatan Ibile's Zanku Records in 2020 and was nominated for Rookie of The Year at The Headies 2020.

== Early life and education ==
Jamiu Damilare Tajudeen was born on 25 October 1995 in Egbeda, Lagos, Nigeria. He is a native of Iganna, Oyo State, Nigeria. He received his primary education at Topaz Emerald School, Egbeda, and secondary education at Millennium Secondary School, Egbeda.

== Musical career ==
Jamopyper initially planned to become a mechanical engineer. However, he began performing at small gatherings at the age of 12, and the positive reception he received led him to pursue a career in music. He started his professional music career in 2015, drawing inspiration from artists such as Akon, Rihanna, Wizkid, Davido, and 9ice.

He released the single "Omode Meta", featuring Zlatan and Naira Marley, in 2018. He followed this with another single, "Josi", featuring Zlatan and Chinko Ekun, which further increased his popularity in the Nigerian music scene.

His career gained more attention following the release of the song "Of Lala", which was popular on Nigerian music video charts. He then released the single "If No Be You," featuring Mayorkun. In an interview with Vanguard Nigeria, he stated, "I am excited about the dimension my musical career has taken. I have a lot of songs coming out, and I am with my team and what they have lined up for me. The competition may be rife, but I am only concentrating on getting better and making good music."

He signed to Zanku Records, owned by Zlatan, in 2019. He has also been featured on several records with other artists.

In 2020, Jamopyper was nominated for Rookie of the Year at The Headies 2020 awards alongside Omah Lay, Laycon, and Tems.

== Discography ==
=== Singles ===
Year	Title	Album	Ref
2018	"Omode Meta" (featuring Zlatan and Naira Marley)		
2019	"Josi" (featuring Chinko Ekun and Zlatan)		
2019	"Jara E" (featuring Small Doctor)		
2020	If No Be You (featuring Mayorkun)		
2020	"Of Lala" (Rahman Jago featuring Zlatan and Jamopyper)		
2020	"Unripe Paw Paw" (with Papisnoop, Zlatan, and Oberz)		
2021	Better Better		

=== As a featured artist ===
Year	Title	Album/ EP	Ref
2019	"MMM" (Boyodre featuring Jamopyper)		
2019	"Gucci Kere" (Boyodre featuring Jamopyper)		
2020	"Bamise" (Leczy featuring Jamopyper and Papisnoop)		
2020	"Of Lala" (Rahman Jago featuring Zlatan and Jamopyper)		
2020	"Shora" (King P featuring Jamopyper)		
2020	"Okoko" (AU PRO featuring Jamopyper and Ice Prince)		
2020	"Shalewa" (Ogor West featuring Jamopyper)		
2020	"Igba (Time)" (King P featuring Olamide and Jamopyper)		
2020	"Ondo" (FCB featuring Jamopyper and Rich Prince)		
2020	"Star Boy" (Destiny Mally featuring Jamopyper)		
2020	"Laye" (Magic Wrld featuring Jamopyper and Hitee)		
2020	"Shomo" (Zlatan featuring Jamopyper, Oberz, and Papisnoop)	Road To CDK	
2020	"Update" (GMG BOSS featuring Jamopyper)		
2021	"Necessary" (SKIIP featuring Jamopyper)		
2021	"Morire" (Papisnoop featuring Bad Boy Timz & Jamopyper)		

== Awards and nominations ==
Year	Event	Prize	Recipient	Result	Ref
2020	The Headies	Rookie of the Year	Himself	Nominated	
