= Jennifer Dias =

Cape Verdean musical artist

- Born: 1985; France
- Occupation: singer
- Years active: 2009-present

Jennifer Dias (born 1985) is a Cape Verdean singer. She sings in Cape Verdean Creole, Portuguese, French and English.

She released her first single titled "Kel ki um kré" in 2009; two years later, she released "Control". A year later, she sang "Deixam em paz" with Nelson Freitas and "Viens danser". In 2013, she released her album Forte (Portuguese for 'strength', also in French). In 2015, she released an English language single named "I Need You So". In 2016, she made a remix titled "Sorry remix kizomba"; later she sang "Ce soir" ("Tonight") and "Dança Ma Mi".

== Discography ==
=== Album ===
- Forte (2013)
1. Tous ces mots
2. Amor Special (Feat. Dj Zayx)
3. Viens danser
4. Play With My Emotions
5. Louca por ti
6. Pourquoi
7. Apaixonada
8. Deixam em paz
9. Forte
10. Je t'emmène
11. Mama Africa (feat. D. Lopes)
12. PS : Je pense à toi
13. Reste avec moi
14. Je t'aime
15. Solução (Portuguese: Solution)
16. Number 2
17. Control (Afro house club remix)
18. Control (Afro house lounge remix)

=== Singles ===
- Kel ki um kré (2009)
- Control (2011)
- Deixam em paz [Portuguese: Heading to Peace] (sur le remix, feat. Nelson Freitas) (2012)
- Viens danser (2012)
- Je t'emmène (2013)
- Louca por ti (2013)
- Reste avec moi [French: Rest With Me] (2013)
- Mama Africa (feat. D. Lopes) (2013)
- Femme fatale 5 (feat. Milca) (2014)
- I Need You So (2015)
- Sorry remix kizomba (2016)
- Ce soir [French: Tonight] (2016)
- Dança Ma Mi (2016)
- Roçaré feat. Dabanda (2018)
- Sentimento Incrível [Portuguese: Incredible Feeling] (2018)
- Acerta feat. Mika Mendes (2018)
- Loco feat. Elji Beatzkilla (2019) video clip filmed in the Custom Café, a Nirvana Studios theater.
- Eu Te Odeio (2019)

=== Collaboration ===
- Taliixo Beatz feat. Jennifer Dias - So Meu (2017)
