= Christopher Imumolen =

Nigerian politician, and academic

Personal details
- Born: 5 September 1983 (age 42)
- Education: PhD Engineering Research and Educational Management; University of Lagos, University of Benin, Pan American College, International Institute of Management and Technology, Global Wealth University
- Occupation: Serial Entrepreneur, Politician
- Website: chrismolen.io

Christopher Irene Imumolen (born 5 September 1983) is the Addo of Abaji, an educationist, a university professor, a serial entrepreneur, a business mogul and a Nigerian politician. He is the founder of Joint Professional Training and Support International Limited (JPTS) and UNIC Foundation, a non-profit, non governmental organization. He was a presidential candidate on the platform of the Accord Party, ahead of the 2023 Nigerian presidential elections.

== Biography ==
Imumolen is an indigene of Esan West, Ekpoma in Edo State. He started his career as a Plant Engineer at BOC Gases Nigeria Plc in February 2005. In 2009, he went on to establish the Joint Professional Training and Support International Limited (JPTS), an educational body that has trained 30,000+ certified Professionals. It is acclaimed that ex-Senator Dino Melaye is one of the institution's alumni, following honorary conferment.

Years after establishing JPTS, Imumolen, on 14 January 2014, proceeded to establish the UNIC Foundation; an empowerment and employment scheme that envisions the goal of supporting four million Nigerian businesses every year with grants and granting reliefs and scholarships to widows and students respectively.

He is the President of the Onshore Offshore Oil and Gas Professional and was also appointed as the Senior Technical Adviser to the Akwa-Ibom state government on Oil and Gas matters. He was also the Technical Safety Consultant to NAPECO Kuwait. He is the Founder of Global Wealth System - a business network system set-up empowering entrepreneurs globally with over 450,000 membership.

Christopher possesses two Ph.D. Academic degrees which are in Engineering Research and Educational Management. He also possesses three Master's degrees and Bachelor's in Mechanical Engineering.

He had his primary education at the Twins Nursery and Primary School, Papa Ajao, Lagos. He had his secondary education in Lagos at the Nigeria Model High School, Idi Oro, Mushin, Lagos, before he proceeded for his degree and professional qualifications at the University of Benin, the University of Lagos, the International Institute of Management and Technology and Global Wealth University among other professional institutions.

He serves as the Addo of Abaji, after his installation by His Royal Highness Adamu Baba Yunusa, the Ona of Abaji, on 11 December 2021.

Sequel to his installation, he said “We went to Abaji to support them in terms of community development. We are working with the police and appropriate authorities to assist them in security and we are also planning to set up educational institutions whereby we can offer scholarships to the indigenes”.

On February 8, 2022, it was reported that Imumolen launched a two billion naira education scholarship trust fund for entertainers in the entertainment industry of Nigeria. Musicians Small Doctor and B-Red were among the beneficiaries of the scheme. According to news report, he described the trust fund as "a promise to help the well-placed celebrities in a better perception of their millions of followers, which will, in turn spur them to begin to believe in education as a sure way to nation building".

In 2019, Imumolen, through his empowerment program supported over 6000 Nigerians with Financial Grant for Businesses between one thousand dollars to ten thousand dollars each. He followed up with the release of over 200 inmates who were detained for bailable offenses.

On 30 January 2021 the media reported that Imumolen picked a form of Interest with the Accord Party, and announced his intent to run for Nigeria's highest office. He popularly stated that the people can't continue to fold their hands with the current state of the nation. Imumolen Irene Christopher (39 years) was the youngest presidential candidate in the 2023 Nigerian Presenditial Election
