= 14th Headies Awards =

Nigerian music industry awards

Headies 2020
- Date: 21 February 2021
- Location: La Campagne Tropicana Beach Resort, Ibeju-Lekki
- Hosted by: Nancy Isime, Bovi

Highlights
- Most awards: Fireboy DML
- Most nominations: Fireboy DML (9)
- Website: theheadies.com

Television/radio coverage
- Network: HipTV

The Headies 2020 was the 14th edition of The Headies, a Nigerian music awards show held to recognize outstanding achievements in the Nigerian music industry. The ceremony took place on February 21, 2021, due to the effects of the COVID-19 pandemic instead of December 2020, the usual month for the awards. It was held at the La Campagne Tropicana Beach Resort in Ibeju-Lekki

The organizers of the event announced TV personality and actress Nancy Isime and comedian Bovi as hosts, this made it the fourth time Bovi will host the event, while Nancy became the first female to host the event for the second time.

The nominees were announced on 4 December 2020 with Fireboy DML leading with nine nominations. Davido and Wurld followed with seven nominations each, while Burna boy the reigning Artiste of the Year secured six nominations.

This year's award rewarded works released between July 2019 and September 2020, this year's award and saw the inclusion of a new category named the Songwriter of the Year to bring to the limelight hardworking individuals who have all significantly supported the creation of quality music.

Timaya, alongside rapper and activist Eedris Abdulkareem received special recognition awards for their impact on the music industry. The main event also saw Jùjú legend King Sunny Ade inducted into the Headies Hall of Fame.

Fireboy DML had the highest award winnings for Headies awards 2020 by securing 4 awards.

== Performances ==
Artiste(s)	Song(s)
J'dess	"Chi Efo"
Stonebwoy	
Chike	"If You No Love"
Olakira	"In My Maserati"
DJ Neptune with Joeboy	"Nobody"
The Cavemen	"Anita"
Master KG	"Jerusalema"
Fireboy DML	"Champion"

== Presenters ==
- Iyabo Ojo and Mai Atafo - Best R&B Single
- Oye Akindeinde - Best Recording of the Year
- Nedu - Best Music Video
- Trevor Henry - Producer of the Year
- Opeyemi Awojobi - Best Vocal Performance (Female)
- Simi Drey and Osi Suave - Best Vocal Performance (Male)
- Omotunde Bamigbade - Best Street-Hop Artiste
- Eniola Badmus and Masterkraft - Rookie of the Year
- Kim Oprah and Broda Shaggi - Best Pop Single
- Laycon and Vee - Best Alternative Song
- Lilian Afegbai - Best Rap Single
- Yinka Adebayo - Best R&B Album
- Idia Aisien and Ayo Makun - Best Alternative Album
- Ayo Makun and Erica Nlewedim - Revelation of the Year

== Winners and nominees ==
Winners appear first and highlighted in bold. A blue ribbon is placed next to each winner.

Best R&B Album	Best Rap Album
**Laughter, Tears and Goosebumps – Fireboy DML**; I Love Girls with Trobul – Sarz (with Wurld); King – Praiz; Boo of the Booless – Chike; Celia – Tiwa Savage	**God's Engineering** – A-Q; The Erigma 2 – Erigga; Illy Chapo X – Illbliss; YPSZN2 – PsychoYP; Cult! – Paybac Iboro
Best R&B Single	Best Pop Single
**"Tattoo" - Fireboy DML**; "Under the Sky" – Praiz; "Duduke" – Simi; "Bad Influence" – Omah Lay; "Dangerous Love" – Tiwa Savage	**"Nobody" – DJ Neptune (featuring Joeboy, Mr Eazi)**; "Billionaire" – Teni; "Lady" – Rema; "FEM" – Davido; "Joro" – Wizkid; "Skeletun" – Tekno
Best Vocal Performance (Male)	Best Vocal Performance (Female)
**Praiz – "Under the Sky"**; Wurld – "Ghost Town"; Chike – "Forgive"; Cobhams – "We Plenti"; Nonso Amadi – "What Makes You Sure"; Johnny Drille – "Count on You"	**Niniola – "Addicted"**; Simi – "No Longer Beneficial"; Lindsey Abudei – "One on the Outside"; J'dess – "Chi Efo"; Yemi Alade – "Lai Lai"; Imanse – "Ajala"
Best Rap Single	Best Street-Hop Artiste
**"Bop Daddy" – Falz (featuring Ms Banks)**; "OGB4IG" – Reminisce; "Shut Up" – Blaqbonez; "Country" – Illbliss; "Get the Info" – Phyno(featuring Falz, Phenom)	**Mayorkun – "Geng"**; Naira Marley & Young John – "Mafo"; Reminisce – "Instagram" (featuring Olamide, Naira Marley, Sarz); Rudeboy – "Audio Money"; IVD & Zlatan – "Bolanle"; Olamide – "Pawon"
Best Collabo	Lyricist on the Roll
**"Know You" – Ladipoe (featuring Simi)**; "Nobody" – DJ Neptune (featuring Joeboy, Mr Eazi); "Sweet in the Middle" – Davido(featuring Naira Marley, Zlatan, Wurld); "Totori" – Olamide (with Wizkid, ID Cabasa); "Get the Info" – Phyno(featuring Phenom, Falz)	**Illbliss – "Country"**; A-Q – "Eunice"; Blaqbonez – "Define Rap 2"; M.I Abaga – "Trinity"; Phenom – "Get the Info"; Phyno – "Speak Life"
Song of the Year	Best Recording of the Year
**"Nobody" – DJ Neptune (featuring Joeboy, Mr Eazi)**; "FEM" – Davido; "Joro" – Wizkid; "Mafo" – Naira Marley; "Duduke" – Simi	**"Ozymandias" – Brymo**; "Smile" – Wizkid(featuring H.E.R.); "Wonderful" – Burna Boy; "Dreamer" – Fireboy DML; "Ghost Town" – Wurld
Album of the Year	Artiste of the Year
**Apollo – Fireboy DML**; African Giant – Burna Boy; Afro Pop Vol. 1 – Adekunle Gold; Yellow – Brymo; Boo of the Booless – Chike	**Wizkid**; Burna Boy; Davido; Mayorkun; Tiwa Savage
Producer of the Year	Best Music Video
**Pheelz – "Billionaire" by Teni**; Spax – "Away" by Oxlade; Kel-P – "Pull Up" by Burna Boy; Sarz – "Mad" by Sarz, Wurld	**"1 Milli" by Davido – Director K**; "Eli" by Fireboy DML – Clarence Peters; "Smile" by Wizkid – Meji Alabi; "Billionaire" by Teni – TG Omori; "Shekere" by Yemi Alade – Ovie Etseyatse
Next Rated	African Artiste Recognition
**Omah Lay**; Tems; Oxlade; Bella Shmurda	**(South Africa) Master KG**; (Ghana) Kuami Eugene; (Kenya) Sauti Sol; (Ghana) Shatta Wale; (Ghana) Stonebwoy
Viewer's Choice	Songwriter of the Year
**Wizkid**; Davido; Omah Lay; Burna Boy; Falz; Fireboy DML; Mayorkun; DJ Neptune	**Simisola Bolatito Ogunleye – "Duduke" by Simi**; Adedamola Adefolahan – "Dreamer" by Fireboy DML; Damini Ogulu – "Way Too Big" by Burna Boy; Stanley Omah Didia – "Bad Influence" by Omah Lay; Sadiq Onifade – "Ghost Town" by Wurld; Adekunle Kosoko – "1 Milli" by Davido
Best Alternative Album	Best Alternative Song
**Roots – The Cavemen**; Yellow – Brymo; Lucid – Aṣa; The Light – Bez; Pioneers – DRB LasGidi	**"I Wonder" – Moelogo**; "Corner" – Lady Donli (featuring VanJess, The Cavemen); "Bitter" – Deena Ade; "Anita" – The Cavemen; "Money Devotion" – Gbasky; "God Save The Queen" – Olu
Rookie of the Year	Hip Hop World Revelation of the Year
**Bad Boy Timz**; Olakira; Alpha P; Jamopyper; Zinoleesky	**Fireboy DML**; Victor AD; Joeboy; Teni; Rema; Chike
Special Recognition Award	Headies Hall of Fame
**Eedris Abdulkareem**; Timaya	**King Sunny Ade**
