= Elizio =

Angolan singer-songwriter (born 1979)

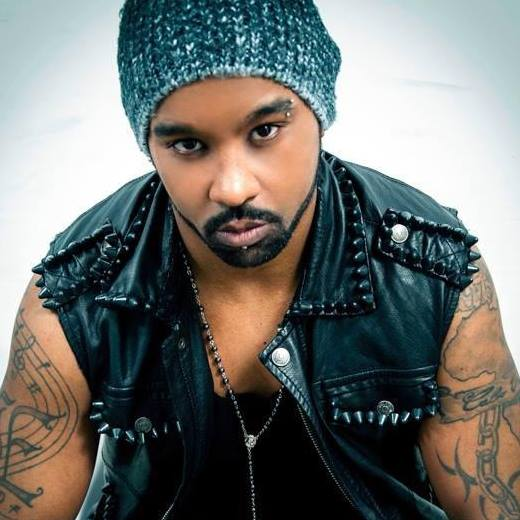
- Born: 1 December 1979 (age 46); Luanda, Angola
- Occupation: Singer-songwriter
- Years active: 2003–present
- Musical career
- Genres: dancefloor; electro; urban; pop; zouk; kizomba; kuduro
- Labels: Dolce Melody
- Website: https://www.youtube.com/user/elizioodc

Elizio, aka Mister ODC (Original Di Cabo Verde) is a singer-songwriter born in Angola in 1979, of Cape Verdean origin. Revealed with the title 10 fois, 100 fois featuring Perle Lama in 2003, Elizio quickly meets his first big solo success with Melodia which leads him to the top of the zouk scene. The artist then connects the tubes and expands his musical universe with more than 70 titles, ranging from general dancefloor with sounds like Bad Man on Kizomba with Angel or Make love on tempo in particular, through the kuduro as Sabi Di Mas.

== Biography ==
Fleeing the massacres of the civil war in Angola, Elizio arrives in France with his mother at the age of 2 years. He goes to university in Paris, to become a sport teacher. His passion for hip hop eventually led quickly into the musical world. In 2001, it occurs on Ragga, hip hop scenes in Paris and in the provinces. His encounter with the artist Kaysha is the beginning of his career as a songwriter and performer.

=== Early career ===
In 2002 he writes and raises his voice on the albums of the biggest names in African Caribbean scene as Kaysha and Soumia. That same year, the artist Passi offers him to participate in the compilation Dis l'heure de zouk which became a double gold disc with the title Laisse parler les gens.

=== First solo album ===
In October 2003 Elizio, released his first solo album Original Di Cabo Verde. The title 10 fois, 100 fois featuring Perle Lama remains six months number 1 ranking in the Afro-Caribbean and is rewarded best duo in 2004 by Dynamitch d'Or. Songs Melodia, Amor (featuring Princess Lover) and Chupa (featuring Kaysha) on the same album also have a lot of success and allow him to become famous. He then toured in more than fifteen countries from Europe to Africa through the United States.

=== Rise ===
In June 2005, is his second album Carpe Diem realised. Songs Carpe Diem featuring Lynnsha, Tu n'oublieras jamais with Priscilla and Ne me laisse pas are consistent success. A few years later, Elizio created his own label Dolce Melody. In March 2008, the third album, Confirmação is released in a limited edition CD / DVD. It also meets several hits including Bonita, Make Love on tempo, Plus loin, plus haut and the Kuduro song Sabi di mas. This album is the most sold album in 2009 on the Portuguese speaking and African market. It is also nominated for Kora Music Awards this year with the title Make love on tempo.

Today, Elizio's videos on YouTube totaling more than 16 million views without any national record company.

== Musical style ==
Born on the zouk scene, the artist Elizio has won a wide audience through his original music that combines different musical styles, mixing urban rhythms, pop, Afro-Caribbean and electro. As a real showman on stage, he leads the dance from all walks of generalist kizomba, through kuduro.

== Discography ==
- October 2003: Original di Cabo Verde
- June 2005: Carpe Diem
- March 2008: Confirmação
- December 2010: I'm Back
- August 2015 : Lindissima – Single

=== Records and awards ===
Year	Title	Type	Record or award
2003	10 fois, 100 fois	title	remained 6 months long number 1 ranking in Afro-Caribbean
2004	10 fois, 100 fois	title	Voted best featuring by Dynamitch d'Or
2009	Confirmaçao	album	The best seller album in the Portuguese spoken market
2009	Make love on tempo	title	nominated for Kora Music Awards

=== Collaborations ===
- Kaysha
- Passi
- Lynnsha
- Ali Angel
- Perle Lama
- Princess Lover
- Kim
- Talina
- Manu Key
- Ludo
- Nichol's
- Mika Mendes
- Celia
- Maryza
- Nelson Freitas
- Johnny Ramos
- Mark G
- Gil Semedo
