= Portable (musician) =

Nigerian singer, rapper, songwriter

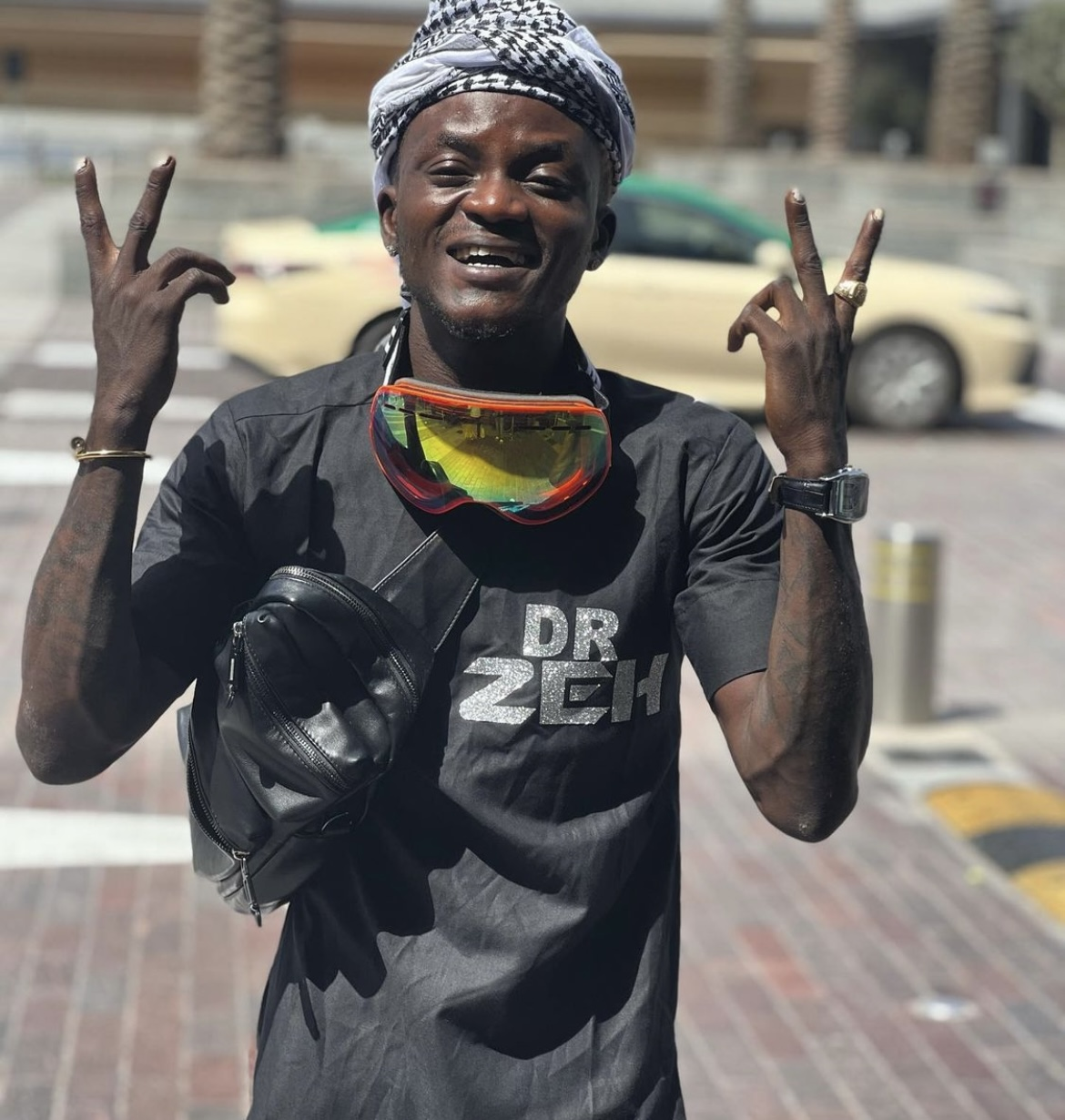

Background information
- Also known as: Olowó Sony; Wahala Musician; Dr. Zeh; Omoolalomi; Ika of Africa
- Born: Habeeb Okikiola Badmus; 12 March 1994 (age 32); Abeokuta, Ogun State, Nigeria
- Genres: Afrobeats; Cruise
- Occupations: Singer; rapper; songwriter
- Instruments: Vocals
- Label: Zeh Nation
- Spouse: Bewaji

Habeeb Okikiola Badmus (born 12 March 1994), popularly known as Portable, is a Nigerian singer, songwriter and rapper. He is known for controversies and online buzz.

== Early life and career ==
Portable was born on 12 March 1994 in Abeokuta, Ogun State, Nigeria. He gained mainstream attention after the single "ZaZoo Zehh", where he featured Olamide and Poco Lee. He publicly accused Kogbagidi a business partner on social media of allegedly scamming him in a deal involving artist management.

== Controversy ==
Portable was arrested by the Ogun State Police Command after he failed to comply with a 72-hour ultimatum to surrender himself in connection with an alleged assault, as per a police invitation. In the early hours of Monday, 3 April 2023, Portable was charged in the Ifo high court in Ogun state.

On 18 February, 2025 Portable was declared wanted by the Ogun State Police Command. He surrendered himself, to the Lagos State Criminal Investigation Department (SCID) in Yaba in Lagos.

On 1 May 2026, Portable was defeated by Carter Efe in a celebrity boxing match held at the Balmoral Hall, Federal Palace Hotel, Lagos.

Another history was made on 1 August 2026, Portable was defeated by Charles Okocha in a celebrity boxing match held at the Balmoral Hall, Federal Palace Hotel, Lagos.

In August 2026, Portable participated in a celebrity boxing rematch against Nollywood actor Charles Okocha, tagged "Unfinished Business," held during the "Chaos in the Ring" event at the Balmoral Convention Centre in Victoria Island, Lagos. The bout ended in controversy when Portable was disqualified after abandoning standard fighting techniques, engaging in an unstructured scuffle, and walking out of the ring before an official ruling could be concluded. Following the fight, Portable accused Okocha of biting him on the back and choking him during the contest, a claim Okocha publicly refuted during an appearance on TVC Entertainment, pointing out that he was wearing a protective mouthguard throughout the match. Shortly after the event, Portable released a diss track addressing the fight's chaotic officiating and targeting both the referee and Okocha.

== Family ==
Portable has 5 children from different women, including a son with Nollywood actress Akinyanju Omobolarinde.

== Discography ==
=== Selected singles ===
Year	Song title
2019	Pay Me My Money
2020	Ema Joke Dada
2021	Zazoo Zeh
2021	Zazoo Zehh (Remix) (Featuring) Olamide & Poco Lee
2022	Ogo Forever
2022	Neighbor (Featuring) Small Doctor
2022	All Eyes On Me (Featuring) Barry Jhay
2022	Oro Aje (Featuring) Oritse Femi
2022	Clear
2022	Expensive OG
2022	Money Before You Love
2022	Gberatan
2022	Odogwu Bitters
2022	Bye To Sapa Nation
2022	Azaman
2022	Won Ma Binu
2023	Testimony
2023	Brabus B
2023	Ogbafia (Featuring) Terry G
2024	Tony Montana (featuring) Skepta
2024	Osunmo Grammy
2024	Brotherhood
2024	My way no be your war
2024	My country
2024	Top chart
2024	Dabira
2024	Stubborn
2024	Dodondawa
2025	Ganusi
2026	Motini Fra

== Award and nominations ==
Year	Award ceremony	Award description	Result	Ref
2022	The Headies	Best Street Artist	Nominated	
2022	The Headies	Rookie of the Year	Nominated	

Skepta released the single "Tony Montana" featuring Portable in 2024.
