= Joro (song) =

Single by Wizkid
- Released: 1 October 2019
- Recorded: 2019
- Genre: Afrobeats
- Length: 4:22
- Label: Starboy; RCA
- Songwriter: Ayodeji Balogun
- Lyricists: Ayodeji Balogun; Onozutu Ezra Enesi
- Producer: Northboi

Wizkid singles chronology
"Ghetto Love" (2019)	"Joro" (2019)	"Arizona" (2020)

Music video
- "Joro" on YouTube

"Joro" is a song by Nigerian singer-songwriter Wizkid, released on 1 October 2019, by Starboy Records and RCA as part of the promotional singles for his fourth studio album, Made in Lagos (2020). Produced by Northboi, the track is a mid-tempo Afrobeats song that blends pulsating rhythms with Wizkid's signature melodies and smooth vocals.

The song's lyrics explore love, devotion, and sensuality themes, set against a vibrant instrumental backdrop. Its title, "Joro", is a Yoruba word that loosely translates to "forever" or "enjoyment", which is reflected in the romantic tone of the song.

The accompanying music video was directed by Adriaan Louw and features Wizkid alongside Georgia Curtis. It broke records on Vevo and YouTube in Nigeria, garnering almost 10 million views within its first month. In 2022, the track received Gold certification in Canada, signifying over 40,000 units sold in sales. The track also continues to perform strongly on YouTube, amassing over 291 million views and being amongst the most-watched African music videos. "Joro" received nominations at The Headies 2020, including Song of the Year.

== Background and release ==
On 17 June 2019, Wizkid announced the upcoming release of his single "Joro" on his social media accounts. The announcement included snippets of the song, its visuals, and the cover art. Prior to this, he had hinted at releasing new music, generating anticipation among fans ahead of Nigeria's Independence Day. Posts shared on platforms like Instagram and Twitter, including a tweet expressing appreciation for his supporters and mentioning the release of new music, garnered attention from his followers. The announcement generated significant engagement from fans and artists, who shared their anticipation on social media. Some fans commented on the teaser visuals, describing them as visually appealing, while others speculated about the song's themes and its potential link to Wizkid's forthcoming album, Made in Lagos.

"Joro" was released on 1 October 2019, aligning with Nigeria's Independence Day. The release served as one of the promotional singles to Wizkid's fourth studio album, Made in Lagos.

== Concept and inspiration ==
"Joro"
A 28-second sample of the chorus from "Joro", where Wizkid is singing the Chorus after the Intro of backing vocals "towards a very luscious wall of sound".

Wizkid described "Joro" as a celebration of love and intimacy, The title, "Joro," is derived from Yoruba, a widely spoken Nigerian language, and reflects Wizkid's incorporation of African cultural elements into his music. The term can be interpreted as "forever" or "enjoyment," aligning with the song's romantic themes.

"Joro" was produced by Northboi, a Nigerian music producer known for crafting Afrobeat instrumentals. Northboi had previously collaborated with Wizkid on the 2018 single "Soco", which was both a commercial and critical success. For "Joro", he employed a fusion of rhythmic percussion, haunting synth melodies, and subtle electronic elements to create a hypnotic, groove-driven sound. Wizkid recorded "Joro" during a series of studio sessions for his fourth album, Made in Lagos. Wizkid described the recording process as intuitive, with the song's melodies and lyrics developing organically.

== Commercial performance ==
Since its release in September 2019, Wizkid's "Joro" has achieved notable success both in Nigeria and internationally. In February 2022, it was certified Gold in Canada by Music Canada for exceeding 40,000 units in sales. In the United States, the track became eligible for Gold certification by the RIAA in November 2024 after surpassing 500,000 units sold. Additionally, "Joro" has garnered over 136 million streams on Spotify and more than 310 million views on YouTube.

== Music video ==
Georgia Curtis appears spellbound by a red light.

The music video for Wizkid's "Joro" was directed by South African filmmaker Adriaan Louw. It incorporates vivid colors and dramatic lighting to complement the song's Afrobeat rhythm. Filmed in multiple locations, it employs symbolic imagery to explore themes of love, passion, and cultural identity, with Wizkid performing the track in atmospherically settings.

A notable aspect of the "Joro" music video is its narrative, featuring model Georgia Curtis, who is depicted as being captivated by a red light, symbolizing the allure of Wizkid's music. The visuals emphasize dance as a form of emotional expression, with choreography that complements the song's rhythmic beats. Wizkid's performance adds to the video's mystique, aligning with the storyline. Upon its release, the video set records in Nigeria, reaching nearly 10 million views in its first month. As of 2024, it has accumulated over 291 million views on YouTube, making it one of the most-watched African music videos. The video also received recognition at The Headies Award 2020, earning nominations for Best Music Video and Song of the Year.

== Controversy ==
The release of Wizkid's "Joro" was accompanied by a public dispute between Wizkid and producer Northboi, who crafted the track. He accused Wizkid of threatening him with a gun over contractual disputes. Northboi alleged that Wizkid failed to properly credit and compensate him for his contributions, including "Joro" and other songs like "Fever". This accusation sparked widespread discussion in the Nigerian music industry about the treatment of producers and their role in the creative process. Northboi further criticized Wizkid for allegedly being reluctant to pay for the beats he produced. The disagreement highlighted ongoing issues of recognition and fair compensation for producers within the Nigerian music ecosystem.

== Accolades ==
Year	Awards ceremony	Award description(s)	Results
2020	The Headies	Best Pop Single	Nominated
2020	The Headies	Best Music Video	Nominated
2020	The Headies	Song of The Year	Nominated

== Certifications ==
Certifications for "Joro"
Region	Certification	Certified units/sales
Belgium (BRMA)	Gold	20,000^{‡}
Canada (Music Canada)	Gold	40,000^{‡}
France (SNEP)	Platinum	200,000^{‡}
Nigeria (TCSN)	2× Platinum	200,000^{‡}
Switzerland (IFPI Switzerland)	Platinum	20,000^{‡}
United Kingdom (BPI)	Silver	200,000^{‡}
United States (RIAA)	Gold	500,000^{‡}
^{‡} Sales+streaming figures based on certification alone.

== Credits and personnel ==
Credits are adapted from the liner notes of Made in Lagos.

Primary Artist:

- Wizkid

Songwriter(s):

- Ayodeji Ibrahim Balogun (Wizkid)
- Onozutu Ezra Enesi

Producer:

- NorthBoi

Mixing and Mastering:

- STG – mixing engineer

Record Label:

- Starboy Entertainment
- RCA

Additional Credits:

- Video Director: Adriaan Louw
- Production Design: Starboy Entertainment Team
