= C4 Pedro =

Angolan kizomba musician

- Also known as: Barbudo, KingCKwa
- Born: Pedro Henriques Lisboa Santos; 7 July 1983 (age 43); Luanda, Angola
- Genres: R&B; Ghetto-Zouk; Kizomba; House
- Occupation: Singer
- Instrument: Vocals
- Years active: 2009–present
- Labels: Sony Music; LS Republicano; BLS Prod

Pedro Henriques Lisboa Santos (born 7 July 1983), better known by his stage name C4 Pedro, is an Angolan musician.

== Biography ==
Son of the singer Lisboa Santos, C4 Pedro was born in Luanda on 7 July 1983, but grew up in Belgium, where he really started his music career with the group Brother Lisboa Santos alongside his brother Lil Saint. After 10 years he went back in Angola to pursue his music career.

He released 3 albums; Lagrimas with Lil Saint, Calor e frio and King Ckwa. He also did a collaboration album in 2013 with the Angolan rapper Big Nelo called B4 Los Compadres. His third album King Ckwa was the most critically acclaimed and the best selling album in Angola in 2015 .

== Discography ==
=== Albums ===
- Lagrimas (2008)
- Calor & Frio [Hot and Cold] (2011)
- King Ckwa (2015)
- The Gentleman IV (2019)

=== Singles (Without albums) ===
- Brothers Lisboa Santos - Não Da Pra Negar (2014)
- Vamos Ficar por Aqui (in the collector album Team de Sonho vol 2)
- Estragar feat AGIR (2016)
- Tá pegar fogo (2016)
- Céu (Pikante Vol.6) (2016)

=== Collaborations with other artists ===
- Edmylson ft. C4 Pedro - Beija Me (2012)
- DaMagical ft. C4Pedro - Me tarraxa (2012
- Angelo Boss ft. C4 Pedro - Me Aceita (2012)
- Titica ft. C4 Pedro - Ta Bem Bom (2012)
- Nelly feat. C4 Pedro & Lil Saint - Mostra o Swagg (2012)
- Kaysha - Kotika ngai te (ft. C4 Pedro) (2013)
- The Lee ft Neide Sofia & C4 Pedro - Saudades (2013) (BLS Prod)
- Nelson Freitas - Bo Tem Mel (ft. C4 Pedro) (2014)
- Zona 5 f. C4 Pedro - Somos angolanos (2014)
- Nga ft. C4 Pedro - Nunca foi pelo money (2014)
- Afrikanas ft. C4 Pedro - Eu sou Topé (2015)
- Yuri da Cunha ft. C4 Pedro - De Alma na Paixão (2015)
- The Groove ft. C4 Pedro, Maya Zuda - Direita Esquerda (2015) (Afrohouse)
- David Carreira - Será Que Posso (feat. C4 Pedro) (2016) (reggaeton)
- Prodígio - Lagosta ft. C4 Pedro (2016)
- Loony Johnson ft. C4 Pedro - Lhes Fala Só (2016)
- Lito Play ft. C4 Pedro - Ta Me Cuiar (2016) (Tarraxinha)
- Adi Cudz feat C4 Pedro - A2 (2016)
- Celso Notiço Feat. C4 Pedro - Me Dá (2016)
- Love again C4 Pedro ft Sauti Soul (2017)
- Quero Mais Love C4 Pedro ft Stonebwoy (2018)

=== With Big Nelo ===
==== Albums ====
- Los Compadres (2013)
- Los Compadres: Ao Vivo Lisboa (2014) - live album - 2 CDs+DVD

==== Singles ====
- "Quem Será (O Verdadeiro Amor) (2015)"

==== Collaborations with other artists ====
- Mona Nicastro ft. B4 - O Teu Toque (2014)
- RFM + D.A.M.A ft. B4 - Natal do Embrulhado (2014)
- Chelsy Chantel ft. B4 - Aonde Qu'eu Falhei (2015)
- Mickael Carreira ft. B4 - Tudo O Que Tu Quiseres (2015)

=== As producer ===
- Telma Lee (debu)
- Sutak - Não é Só (2016)
- Nadine Pereira - Eu Espero (2016)
