= Gasha (singer) =

- Birth name: Gah-Ndo Ashuembom Amabo
- Born: 18 March 1991 (age 34) Bamenda, Cameroon
- Genres: Afrobeats, Afropop, Soul music, hip hop
- Occupation(s): Singer, songwriter
- Years active: 2013–present
- Labels: TC Concepts International / The Big Kompound; Dule inc / Overseas Rec Africa

Gah-Ndo Ashuembom Amabo (born 18 March 1991) professionally known as Gasha, is an Afro-pop, Afrobeats Soul singer from Cameroon. She made herself known in October 2013 with her debut single Kaki Mbere.

== Biography ==
Gasha was born in Bamenda, Cameroon in 1991 where she grew up with her parents, native of Bafut in the North West Region. She started singing at the age of 11 in high school influenced by artists such as Tracy Chapman, Sam Cooke, Jason Mraz, Richard Bona, Coldplay, Eboa Lotin, Lauryn Hill and Donny Elwood.

In 2013, she released her first single "Kaki Mbere", an Afrobeat song produced by Cameroonian music producer DiJay Pazzo. The song was a huge success and made her popular on the national and African music Scene.,

In 2014, she was awarded the best female artist for central Africa at the African Muzik Magazine Awards (AFRIMMA) in Dallas, Texas. In 2015, she recorded Chill with Ugandan artist Eddy Kenzo.

She later collaborated with Miss Africa USA pageant for the "Women Will Change Africa" campaign and soundtrack. The Song Gasha sings in Pidgin and English.

== Discography ==
=== Singles ===
- 2013: Kaki Mbere
- 2013: This Life
- 2014: Faya di Burn feat Magasco
- 2014: I notice
- 2014: There he goes
- 2014: The Date
- 2015: Black I am feat. Stanley Enow
- 2015: Women Will Change Africa (EP)
- 2016: Ma kong Wa
- 2016: this Life Remix feat LAW G
- 2017: Back To Reality
- 2017: Murder
- 2017: We Still Dey feat Nabil
- 2018: Le Meilleur

== Awards and recognitions ==
- 2015: Best female artist for central Africa at AFRIMMA
