= Stanley Enow =

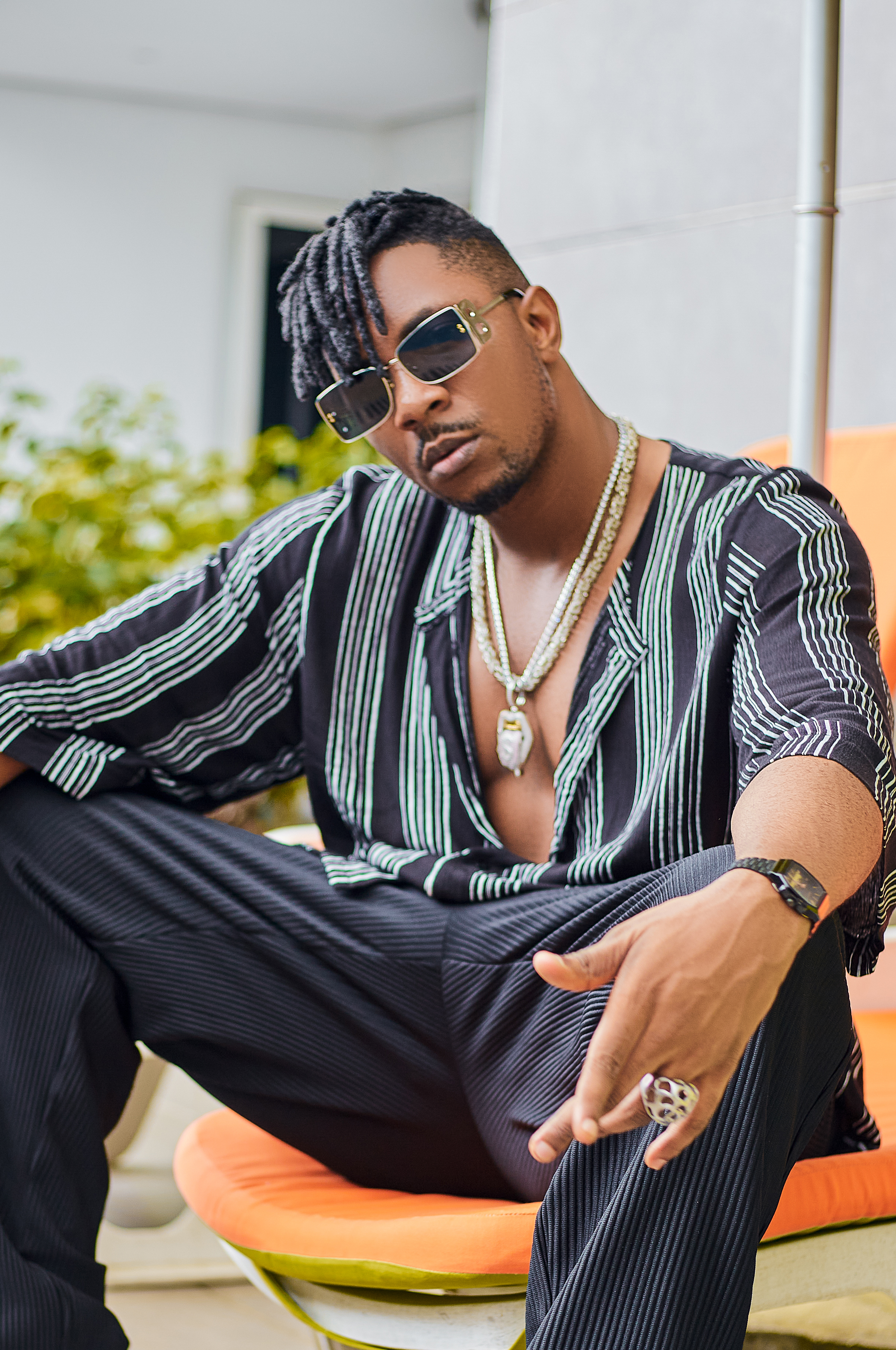
- Photo of Stanley Enow in 2022

Background information
- Also known as: Bayangi Boy
- Born: Stanley Ebai; Bamenda, Cameroon
- Origin: Douala, Cameroon
- Genres: Hip-hop; Afro Pop; dance hall; Afrobeat
- Occupations: Rapper, Singer, Song writer, Philanthropist
- Years active: 2013–present
- Label: Motherland Empire
- Website: www.stanleyenow.net

Stanley Ebai Enow (born 2 August 1985) is a Cameroonian rapper, and music producer. He is the co-owner of the record label, Motherland Empire. Enow is best known for his 2013 single "Hein Père". He was the first Cameroonian to win in the Best New Act category at the 2014 MTV Africa Music Awards.

== Biography ==
=== Early life ===
Enow was born in Bamenda, the capital of the Northwest Region of Cameroon. He is Bayangi from the Southwest Region, giving rise to his nickname "Bayangi Boy". Enow grew up in Bafoussam, the capital of the West Region, where he completed his primary and his secondary school at the Government Bilingual High School. In 2007, he relocated to Douala, the capital of the Littoral Region, where he graduated with a degree in business journalism from the University of Douala.

=== Career ===
Enow started writing rap lyrics and break-dancing while in high school. He later performed on Groove and Cocktail Hit Parade, two popular night shows in Cameroon. He also performed on several private radio stations, where he worked as an animator and director. Enow hosted the television music show Mboa, and has done voice-over advertising for the Pan African telecommunications company MTN Group.

Enow released his debut single "Hein Père" in June 2013, prompting Trace TV to label him "African music Revelation of the Year." The "Hein Pere" music video won the award for Best Video of the Year at the 2013 Balafon Music Awards. The song was ranked at number 1 on Reverbnation's Cameroon list, and on Trace Africa. The remix of the song features South African artist F.A.B. Enow's second single "TumbuBoss" ("Toumbou Boss Deluxe") was released in April 2014.

At the first Cameroon Academy Awards in 2013, Enow took home two plaques: Male Artist of the Year and Urban Artist of the Year. Enow is the only Cameroonian to be nominated for the MTV Africa Music Awards, where he won the Best New Act award in 2014. He also won Best New Act and was nominated for Best Male Central Africa at the 2014 African Muzik Magazine Awards.

Enow released "TumbuBoss" as the second single from his debut studio album, Soldier Like My Papa. The music video for the song was shot and directed by Shamack Allharamadji. In March 2014, Enow told Pulse Nigeria that he worked with Nyanda on the song "In The Middle", which was produced by Jamaican producer Black Lion. On 5 October 2014, he released the music video for "Njama Njama Cow", which was directed by Shamack Allharamadji

In July 2015, Enow dropped his debut studio album titled Soldier Like My Papa. "Work Hard (Le Père Noël)" was released as the fifth single from the album. Its music video was released on September 11, 2015.

== Discography ==
=== Albums ===
- Soldier Like Ma Papa (2015)
- Stanley vs Enow (2019)

=== EPs ===
- Tumbuboss (2014)

=== Selected singles ===
- "Hein Père" (2013)
- "TumbuBoss" (2014)
- "Slippery When Wet" (Remix) (Nyanda featuring Stanley Enow) (2014)
- "Njama Njama Cow" (2014)
- "Black Commando" (Fuse ODG featuring Stanley Enow and Olamide) (2014)
- "Njama Njama Cow" (Remix) (featuring Sarkodie) (2014)
- "How E Go Be" (2face Idibia featuring Stanley Enow) (2015)
- "Black I Am" (Gasha featuring Stanley Enow) (2015)
- "King Kong" (featuring DJ Neptune) (2015)
- "Work Hard" ("Le Père Noel") (2015)
- "Phoenix" (2016)
- "Adore You" (featuring Mr Eazi) (2017)
- "Elle est Là" (2018)
- "Caramel" (featuring Davido) (2017)
- "Casanova" (2018)
- "My Way" (featuring Tzy Panchak and Locko (2018)
- "Amigo" ( featuring Stanley Enow) ( 2025 ).
- My Hustle ~ Danny Green 237Towncryer ft. Stanley Enow - (Chakap By Adrenaline).

== Awards and nominations ==
Cameroon Academy Awards

Year	Nominee / work	Award	Result
2013	Himself	Best Male Artist of the Year	Won
2013	Himself	Best Urban Artist of the Year	Won

Balafon Music Awards

Year	Nominee / work	Award	Result
2013	Hein Père	Best Video of the Year	Won

MTV Africa Music Awards

Year	Nominee / work	Award	Result
2014	Himself	Best New Act	Won

African Muzik Magazine Awards

Year	Nominee / work	Award	Result
2014	Himself	Best Male Central Africa	Nominated
2014	Himself	Best New Act	Won

Canal d'or 10th edition (Canal 2 International Awards)

Year	Nominee / work	Award	Result
2015	Stanley Enow	Best New Act	Won
2015	Stanley Enow	Artist of the Year	Nominated
2015	Stanley Enow	Best Urban Artist	Won
2015	"Njama Njama Cow" (Remix)	Best Video	Nominated

== See also ==
- List of Cameroonians
- List of African musicians
