= G-Amado =

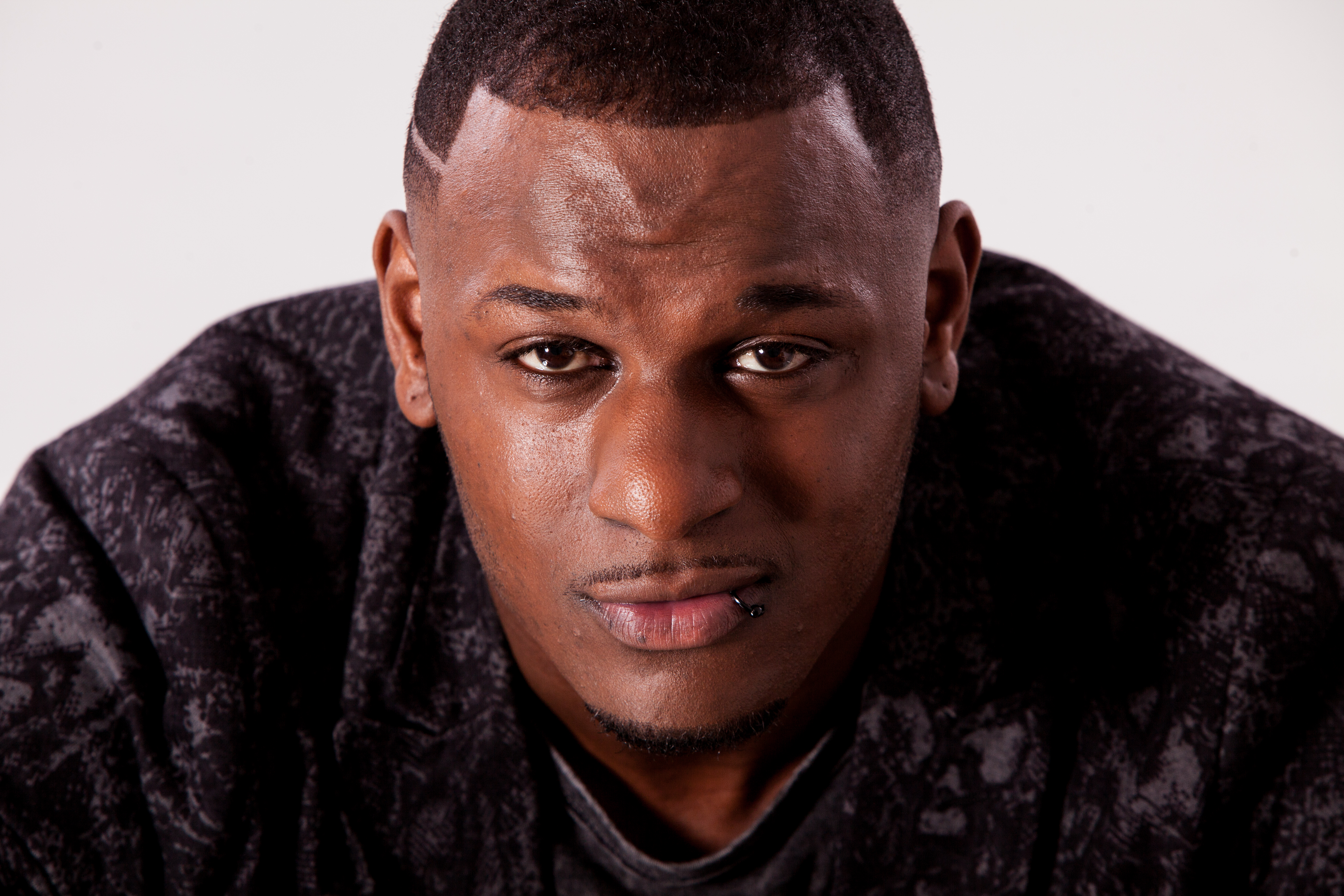

Background information
- Born: Gonçalo Jorge Amado da Veiga; 11 April 1985 (age 41); Lisbon, Portugal
- Genres: Ghetto-Zouk, rhythm and blues
- Occupations: singer, actor
- Years active: 2011-present
- Website: https://www.instagram.com/g_amado/

Gonçalo Jorge Amado da Veiga, better known as G-Amado (born 11 April 1985) is a singer and an actor mainly on Ghetto-Zouk and R&B songs.

== Biography ==
He was born in Lisbon, the capital of Portugal to Cape Verdean immigrants.

He began his music career in 2011 and signed to Dreambitz records. His first single was "Bo ca ta amam", his first album was Nhas Letras (Our Letters) released in 2012. He later released a single "Nha Vida" ("Our Life") in 2013 and later his second album Capítulos (Captives) in 2014. In September 2014, he was the music artist of the month. "Casamento" was his single released in 2015 and later "Ela Me Kuia" with Daduh King. Also in that year, he made his guest appearance in a Portuguese TVI telenovela A Única Mulher with the songs "Estrela Guia" ("Guided Star") and "Mulher Perfeita" ("Perfect Woman"), a year later, he sang "Louca" with Edmundo Vieira in the same telenovela in an episode. Also in 2016 in September, he made his third and recent album titled Além do Amor.

He also sang with Mika Mendes, Jamice and Badoxa.

== Discography ==
=== Albums ===
- Nhas Letras (2012)
- Capítulos (2014)
- Além do Amor (2016)
- O Teu Moço (2019)

=== Singles ===
- "Bo Ca Ta Amam" (2011)
- "Nha Vida" (2013)
- "Casamento" (2015)
- "Ela Me Kuia" (feat. Daduh King) (2015)

=== Collaborations ===
- Badoxa: "Mulher Perfeita"
- G-Snake: "Melaço"
- I.Van: "Desbloquear" ("Unblocked")
- Mika Mendes: "Alguen Ki Un Gosta" and "Hora Ki Bo Pega Fogo" (2012)
- DJ Pausas and Don G: "Esta Noite" ("The Night")

=== Special appearances ===
- 2015 - Estrela Guia – telenovela A Única Mulher of TVI
- 2016 - Louca, com Edmundo Vieira – telenovela A Única Mulher of TVI
