= Soumia =

French singer (born 1977)

Soumia Bahri or just Soumia (born August 27, 1977 in Saint-Mandé, Val-de-Marne) is a French Zouk singer.

== Biography ==
Soumia Bahri was born near Paris (France) to Moroccan parents, She has a Master's degree in linguistics. Her first involvement in music was by doing background vocals in a rapband. In 1998 she teams up with singer Talina to record the Zouksong Temps pou Temps. This earned her some popularity in the Paris music scene. A second recording, Life, was released in 2001. Soumia releases her first album, Still in Love, in 2002 with the Section Zouk label. The album is quite popular in the Afro-Caribbean music scene, and gave her the chance to many more collaborations with Zouk artists. Her second album is called In Love Again, and was released in 2005. She combines the Zouk musical style with influences from R'n'B, soul music, and African styles, wrote her own lyrics, and coproduced the album. Her third album is called Confidences, and released in 2009.

== Discography ==
=== Albums ===
- 2002 Still in Love (Section Zouk)
- 2005 In Love Again (Section Zouk, Sushiraw)
- 2009 Confidences (Sushiraw)

=== Collaborations ===
- 1998 Temps pou Temps, with Talina
- 2001 Life, with Kaysha
- Je sais qui elle est, with Kaysha
- I'll be there for you, (album Dis l'heure du Zouk) with Passi
- Les belles choses, with Danny Dan

== References and links ==
- (in French) Biography on Afromontreal, retrieved Sept 29, 09.
- (in French) French AOL music entry, retrieved Sept. 29, 09
- Soumia on Myspace, retrieved Sept. 29, 09
