= DJ Neptune =

Nigerian DJ & producer (born 1990)

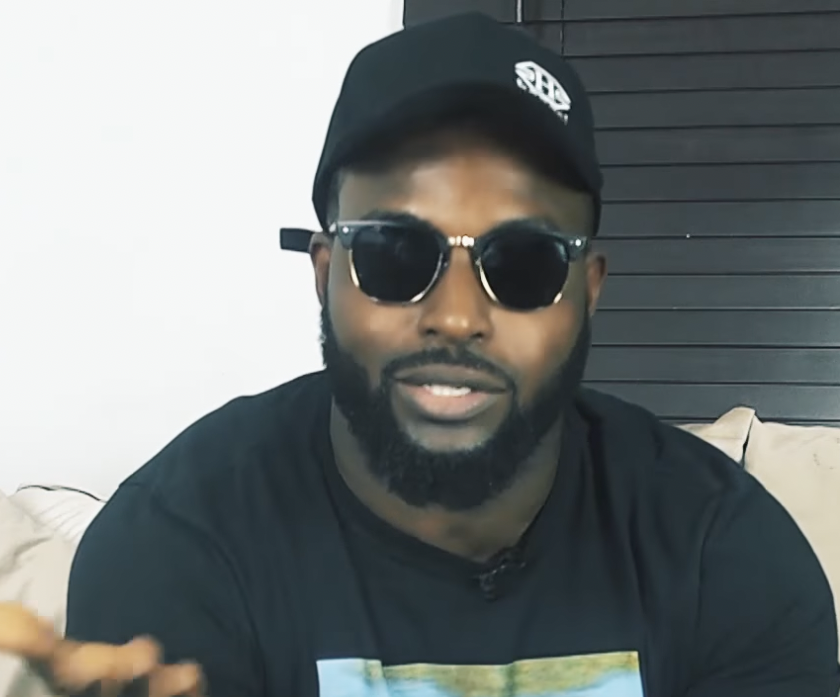

Background information
- Born: Imohiosen Patrick; September 25, 1990 (age 36); Lagos State, Nigeria
- Origin: Edo State, Nigeria
- Genres: AfroPop, Hip hop
- Occupations: DJ, Record Producer, Radio personality
- Years active: 2001–present
- Labels: Neptune Records; Greatness Republik
- Website: www.djneptune.net

Imohiosen Patrick (born 26 September 1990), professionally known as DJ Neptune, is a Nigerian DJ and record producer born in Lagos, Nigeria.

== Early life ==
Imohiosen Patrick was born on 26 September 1990 in Lagos, he hails from Edo State, Nigeria. He is from a family of four which includes his three elder sisters and him.

== Career ==
Neptune began his professional career as a disc jockey in 2001, after receiving mentorship from UK-based DJ Douglas. He had developed an interest in DJing after seeing a live DJ performance in 1999 and subsequently began learning the craft while still in school. In 2001, he began pursuing DJing professionally while continuing his studies. In 2004, Neptune joined RayPower 100.5 FM Lagos, initially working as a freelance DJ before becoming a staff member in 2005. He remained with the station until 2010, during which time he became known for his radio mixes and developed a wider profile within Nigeria's music industry. During the late 2000s, Neptune expanded his work beyond radio into live performances, artist collaborations and mixtapes.

In 2008, he became the official DJ and hype man for Nigerian rapper Naeto C, working with him on tours and performances. He also began releasing promotional mixtapes and performing at concerts and entertainment events in Nigeria and internationally. He later expanded into music production and recording. He released a series of singles, remixes and collaborative projects while continuing to work as a DJ. He released a series of singles and collaborations, including "1,2,3" featuring M.I, Naeto C and Da Grin, "Skoobi Doo" featuring Jesse Jagz, General Pype and Lynxxx, "So Nice" featuring Davido and Del B, and "Baddest" featuring Olamide, Stonebwoy and BOJ. He also continued producing and releasing mixtapes while working as a DJ and radio personality. In 2018, Neptune released his debut studio album, Greatness. The 15-track album featured collaborations with artists including M.I, Jesse Jagz, Olamide, Niniola, Kizz Daniel, Maleek Berry, Mayorkun, Davido, Phyno, Yemi Alade, Patoranking, Runtown and Mr Eazi. The album marked Neptune's transition from primarily being known as a DJ and radio personality to establishing himself as a producer and curator of collaborative recording projects.

In 2020, Neptune released "Nobody", featuring Joeboy and Mr Eazi. The song became one of his most commercially successful releases and was subsequently included on his second studio album, Greatness 2.0. "Nobody" became the first Nigerian song to peak at number one on TurnTable End of the Year Top 50 of 2020, and was nominated for Best Pop Single and Song of the Year at the 14th Headies Awards.

Neptune followed the success of "Nobody" with Greatness 2.0, released on 26 November 2021 through Neptune Records in partnership with emPawa Africa. The album featured artists including Mr Eazi, Joeboy, Yemi Alade, Stonebwoy, Patoranking, Omah Lay, Simi, Focalistic and Harmonize. The project incorporated Afrobeats, amapiano and other contemporary African musical styles. In 2023, Neptune continued releasing collaborative singles, including "Mumu" and "Bienvenue". He subsequently expanded the Greatness series album with Greatness III, which featured artists including Qing Madi, Joshua Baraka, Olivetheboy, Ice Prince, Joeboy, LAX and Ruger. The album continued Neptune's approach of combining established and emerging African artists across Afrobeats and other contemporary genres.

In 2025, Neptune released Greatness IV, the fourth installment in the Greatness album series. The 14-track album incorporated Afrobeats with elements of soukous, Ghanaian drill, bongo flava, and amapiano, and featured collaborations with artists including Reehaa, Kabusa Oriental Choir, Moelogo, Gbolar Mighty, and Hotkeed. In 2026, he released "Okpeke (Dance for Me)" featuring Joeboy and Odumodublvck.

== Discography ==
=== Albums ===
- Greatness (2018)
- Greatness 2.0 (2021)
- Greatness III (2024)
- Greatness IV (2025)

=== EPs ===
- Love and Greatness (2019)

=== Singles ===
- "1,2,3" (featuring M.I, Naeto C and Da Grin )
- "Skoobi Doo" (featuring General Pype, Lynxxx and Jesse Jagz )
- "So Nice" (featuring Davido and Del B)
- "Baddest" (featuring Olamide, BOJ, and Stonebwoy)
- "Marry" (featuring Mr Eazi)
- "Wait" (featuring Kizz Daniel) (produced by Jay Pizzle)
- "Demo" (featuring Davido)
- "Nobody" (featuring Joeboy and Mr Eazi)

=== Featured songs ===
Singles
| Title | Artist | Album | Release date |
|---|---|---|---|
| Doinz | Yung6ix | 6ix O Clock (February 6, 2014) | October 9, 2014 |
| King Kong | Stanley Enow | Soldier like ma papa (July 25, 2015) | March 26, 2015 |
| Azaman | Slimcase, 2Baba, Peruzzi, DJ Neptune, Larry Gaaga | Non-Album single | February 1, 2019 |

== Awards and nominations ==
| Year | Awards ceremony | Award description(s) | Results |
|---|---|---|---|
| 2008 | Nigeria Entertainment Awards | World DJ | Nominated |
| 2009 | Nigeria Entertainment Awards | World DJ | Won |
| 2009 | Tush Award | Best Dj | Won |
| 2010 | Dynamix All Youth Award | Best Nigerian DJ | Won |
| 2010 | Africa Entertainment awards | International Best Dj | Won |
| 2011 | NPA Awards | International DJ | Won |
| 2012 | Nigeria Entertainment Awards | World Dj | Won |
| 2020 | The Headies | Best Pop Single - Nobody | Won |

== See also ==
- List of Nigerian DJs
