= Skeletun =

Single by Tekno

from the album Coming 2 America (Amazon Original Motion Picture Soundtrack)
- Released: 8 October 2019
- Genre: Afropop
- Length: 3:12
- Label: Island Records; The Cartel Entertainment
- Songwriter: Augustine Miles Kelechi
- Producer: Phantom

Tekno singles chronology
"Agege" (2019)	"Skeletun" (2019)	"Putin" (2020)

Music video
- "Skeletun" Video on YouTube

"Skeletun" is a song recorded by Nigerian singer-songwriter Tekno, it was released on 8 October 2019, by the Cartel Entertainment. It was written by Tekno and produced by Phantom. The song was featured on the soundtrack to Coming 2 America. It debuted at number 19 on the first ever official UK Afrobeats Singles Chart and was nominated for Best Pop Single at The Headies 2020.

== Background and reception ==
Tekno's pandering set benefits greatly from the "Skeletun" production. The hit song is obviously made to appeal to club-hopping people with catchphrases like "e don tey wey we dey shayo" and lyrics appreciating a love interest's physique, especially with peak flexing and concert season on the horizon. The music video was released this same day, on the 8 October 2019, directed by TG Omori

== Commercial performance ==
The video debuted on Soundcity's Naija Top 20, and also on MTV Base's Official Naija Top 10. It debuted 19 at the first ever official UK Afrobeats Singles Chart and was nominated for Best Pop Single at The Headies 2020. On 5 March 2021, Def Jam Recordings, in conjunction with Def Jam Africa, release the 'Rhythms of Zamunda,' the original soundtrack to the sequel of Eddie Murphy's 1988 classic Coming 2 America, the soundtrack features original songs from African artistes including 'Skeletun'. OkayAfrica describe it that 'Tekno introduces his newest terms to the afropop lexicon with "skeletun," "kelepu," and "keletu" over a tasty highlife rhythm. "Skeletun," which is amusing and illogical, was created by a talented musician who is always learning new musical depths.' and include it on the Best Nigerian Songs of the Month (October).

== Accolades ==
The song was nominated for Best Pop Single at The Headies 2020.

== Release history ==
Region	Date	Format	Label	Ref.
Various	8 October 2019	Digital download; streaming	Island Records; The Cartel Entertainment	
