= Nobody (DJ Neptune song) =

2020 song by DJ Neptune

Single by DJ Neptune featuring Joeboy & Mr Eazi

from the album Greatness 2.0
- Released: 5 March 2020
- Recorded: 2020
- Genre: Afrobeats; hip hop
- Length: 2:25
- Label: Neptune
- Songwriters: Joseph Akinfenwa-Donus; Oluwatosin Ajibade
- Producer: Magicsticks

DJ Neptune singles chronology
| "Tomorrow" (2020) | "Nobody" (2020) | "Bembe" (2020) |

Joeboy singles chronology
| "Beginning" (2019) | "Nobody" (2020) | "Call" (2021) |

Mr Eazi singles chronology
| "Kpalanga" (2020) | "Nobody" (2020) | "I No Go Give Up On You" (2020) |

Music video
- "Nobody" on YouTube

"Nobody" is a song by Nigerian disk jockey DJ Neptune, released as the second single from his second studio album Greatness 2.0 (2021). The song was released as a single on 5 March 2020. It was produced by Magicsticks and features vocals from Nigerian singers Joeboy and Mr Eazi. "Nobody" is the first Nigerian song to peak at number one, on TurnTable End of the Year Top 50 chart.

== Background and composition ==
According to DJ Neptune, "When Joeboy voiced the hook on Nobody’s beat, I already knew it was hit even before delivering his verse. Immediately I buzzed Mr Eazi up and told him I wanted him on a record and He said sure to send me the beat. Eazi heard the song and didn’t estimate to jump on it and in no time his vocals were in. This is how we created Nobody." "Nobody" is an Afrobeats-inspired take on hip-hop and was produced by Magicsticks.

== Music video ==
An accompanying music video for "Nobody" was released on the same day with the single and was directed by TG Omori. It's a comedic video that pays homage to Michael Jackson's choreography.

== Critical response ==
"Nobody" received positive reviews from music critics and consumers. Enemanna Chidinma of "Blackcard Empire" gave "Nobody" an 8/10 rating, noting that "the length is too short for such a catchy tune". An editor for SoundStroke gave "Nobody" an 8.0/10 rating, stating that "the bop will last for a long time", while also noting that "the song is a scintillating major melody that resonates well".

== Commercial performance ==
"Nobody" debuted at number nineteen on TurnTable Top 50 streaming songs chart, on 14 July 2020. In United Kingdom, "Nobody" debuted at number eighteen on the UK official Top 20 Afrobeats songs of 2020, and debuted at number one on TurnTable End of the Year Top 50 chart in 2020. "Nobody (Icons Remix)" debuted at number nine on TurnTable Top 50, on 9 November 2020, shortly after its first issue was released. (Note: "Nobody" didn't peak on the TurnTable Top 50, but "Nobody (Icon Remix)" featuring Laycon did.) On 9 July, it peaked at number seven on TurnTable Top 50 Airplay chart. On 1 December, it debuted at number forty-nine on TurnTable TV Top songs chart. On 1 November 2020, "Nobody (Icons Remix)" peaked at number eight on TurnTable Top Triller chart Nigeria.

== Charts ==
=== Weekly charts ===
Weekly chart performance for "Nobody"
| Chart (2020) | Peak position |
|---|---|
| TurnTable Top 50 (TurnTable) | 9 |
| TurnTable Top 50 Airplay (TurnTable) | 7 |
| Top 50 Streaming Songs (TurnTable) | 19 |
| TurnTable TV Top songs (TurnTable) | 49 |
| Top Triller chart Nigeria (TurnTable) | 8 |

=== Year-end charts ===
Year-end chart performance for "Nobody"
| Chart (2020) | Peak position |
|---|---|
| UK Afrobeats Singles Chart (OCC) | 18 |
| End of the Year Top 50 (TurnTable) | 1 |
