= Greatness (album) =

Studio album by DJ Neptune
- Released: 25 May 2018
- Genre: Afrobeats
- Length: 53:06
- Labels: Neptune Records; emPawa Africa
- Producers: Masterkraft; Legendury Beatz; Magicsticks; Young Jonn; CKay; Sossick; Spellz; Jay Pizzle; GospelOnTheBeatz; Del B; Simba Tagz; JaysonBeatz; Teddy; Major Bangz

DJ Neptune chronology
| Greatness (2018) | Love and Greatness (2019) |

Singles from Greatness
- 1. "Shawa Shawa" Released: 27 April 2018

Greatness is the debut studio album by Nigerian disc jockey DJ Neptune. It was released on 25 May 2018 by Neptune Records, through emPawa Africa. The album features artists from Nigeria and other African countries, including Burna Boy, Mayorkun, Niniola, Olamide, CDQ, Slimcase, Zoro, Reminisce, Kizz Daniel, Jesse Jagz, M.I Abaga Maleek Berry, Skales, Harmonize, Davido, Phyno, Small Doctor, Yemi Alade, Patoranking, Efya, Willy Paul Pasuma, Mr Real, Runtown, Mr Eazi and C4 Pedro.

== Background and release ==
Before releasing Greatness, Neptune had established himself in Nigeria's music industry as a disc jockey. He unveiled the album's artwork and track listing in May 2018 ahead of its release. Contemporary reports described the project as containing 13 tracks and two bonus tracks and highlighted its extensive list of guest artists and producers. A private listening event for the album was held on 17 May 2018, attended by music journalists, industry stakeholders and fans.

== Singles ==
"Shawa Shawa" was released on 27 April 2018, as the lead single of the album.

== Track listing ==
Greatness track listing
| No. | Title | Writer(s) | Producer(s) | Length |
|---|---|---|---|---|
| 1. | ""Blood & Fire"" (featuring Jesse Jagz and M.I Abaga) | Imohiosen Patrick; Jesse Abaga; Jude Abaga | Ckay | 3:16 |
| 2. | "Shayo" (featuring Burna Boy) | Imohiosen Patrick; Damini Ebunoluwa Ogulu | Sossick | 3:05 |
| 3. | "Tear Rubber" (featuring Mayorkun) | Imohiosen Patrick; Adewale Emmanuel | Young Jonn | 3:41 |
| 4. | "Rolling" (featuring Niniola) | Imohiosen Patrick; Niniola Apata | Magicsticks | 3:17 |
| 5. | "Shawa Shawa" (featuring Larry Gaaga, Olamide, CDQ and Slimcase) | Imohiosen Patrick; Larry Ndianefo; Olamide Adedeji; Sodiq Yusuf; Oluwafemi Oladapo | Masterkraft | 3:41 |
| 6. | "Friday" (featuring Zoro, and Reminisce) | Imohiosen Patrick; Owoh Chrismathner; Remilekun Safaru | JaysonBeatz | 3:05 |
| 7. | "Wait" (featuring Kizz Daniel) | Imohiosen Patrick; Daniel Anidugbe; Joshua Osajikwoeh | Jay Pizzle | 3:38 |
| 8. | "My World" (featuring Maleek Berry) | Imohiosen Patrick; Maleek Shoyebi | Legendury Beatz | 3:43 |
| 9. | "Do Like I Do" (featuring Skales, and Harmonize) | Imohiosen Patrick; Raoul Njeng-Njeng; Rajabu Ibrahim | Spellz | 3:15 |
| 10. | "Secret Agenda" (featuring Davido and Phyno) | Imohiosen Patrick; David Adeleke; Chibuzor Azubuike | Magicsticks | 3:49 |
| 11. | "Sisi" (featuring Small Doctor, Pasuma and Mr Real) | Imohiosen Patrick; Adekunle Temitope; Wasiu Odetola; Okafor Victor | Magicsticks | 4:17 |
| 12. | "No Body" (featuring Yemi Alade and Willy Paul) | Imohiosen Patrick; Yemi Alade; Wilson Radido | Major Bangz; Teddy | 3:12 |
| 13. | "In a Way" (featuring Patoranking and Efya) | Imohiosen Patrick; Patrick Okorie; Jane Awindor | GospelOnDeBeatz | 4:05 |
| Total length: | | | | 46:04 |

bonus track
| No. | Title | Writer(s) | Producer(s) | Length |
|---|---|---|---|---|
| 14. | "Why" (featuring Runtown) | Imohiosen Patrick; Douglas Agu | Del B | 4:13 |
| 15. | "Mia Mia" (featuring Mr Eazi, and C4 Pedro) | Imohiosen Patrick; Oluwatosin Ajibade; Pedro Lisboa | Simba Tagz | 2:49 |
| Total length: | | | | 7:02 |
