= Kaysha =

French singer/rapper (born 1974)

Kaysha Edward Mokolo Jr.
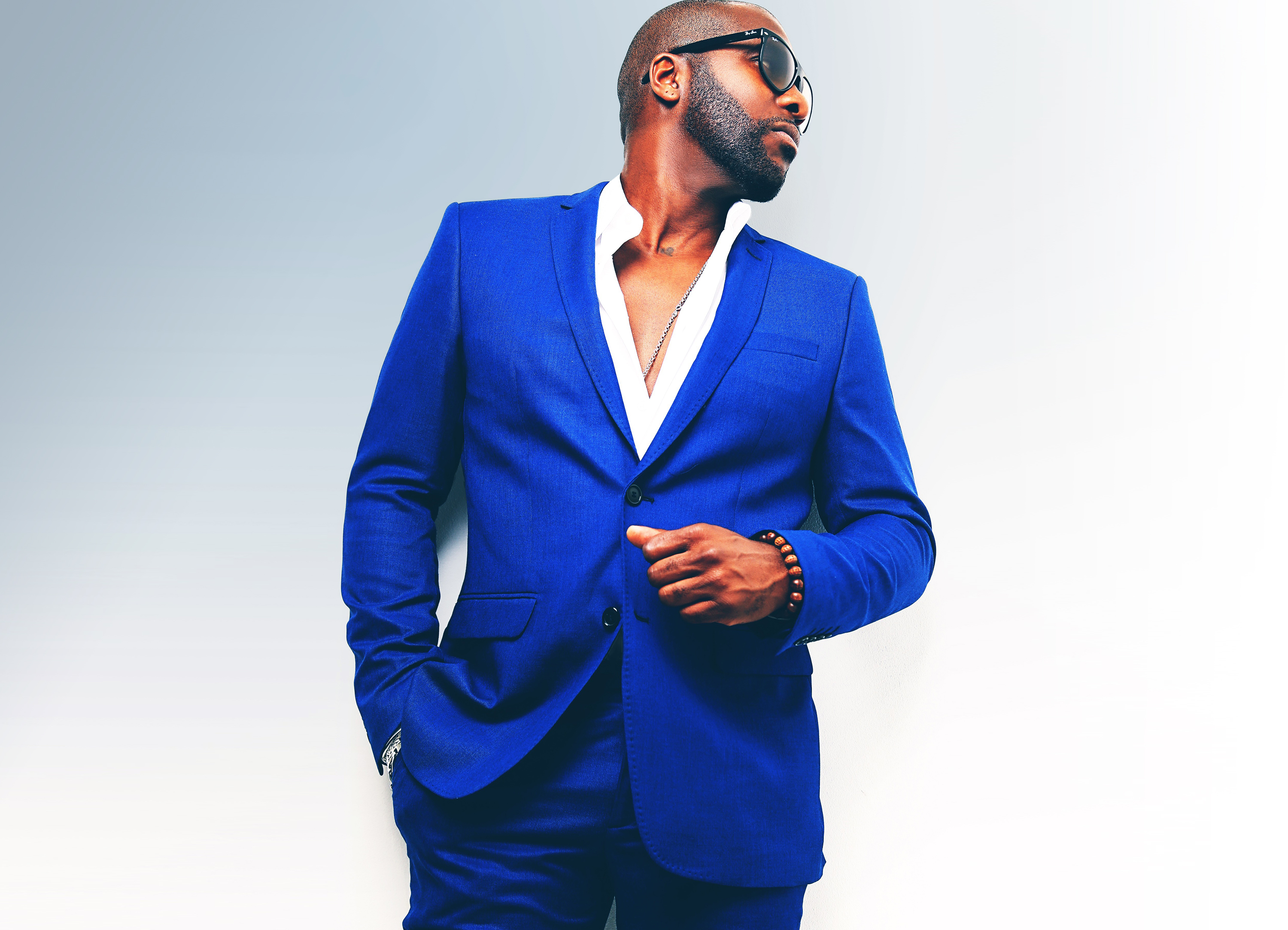

Background information
- Born: Edward Mokolo Jr. 1974 (age 51–52); Kinshasa, Zaire
- Genres: Kizomba; zouk; afropop; afro house; R&B
- Occupations: Singer; rapper; businessman; producer
- Years active: 1992–present
- Label: Sushiraw

Edward Mokolo Jr. (born 1974), better known as Kaysha, is a French singer/rapper and producer from the Democratic Republic of the Congo (former Zaire). He is the son of Congolese politician Édouard Mokolo Wa Mpombo.

== Career ==
He was born in Kinshasa, Zaire but emigrated to France with his parents at the age of seven. Kaysha's first single, which used a sample from French West Indian band Kassav's Oulé, was called "Bounce Baby".

Kaysha's second single was "Telephone", from his album I'm Ready. The next year, he changed his entire style to record a more urban album called Worldwidechico with a duo with Wu-Tang Clan's Killah Priest. One of his biggest single is the global African hit "On dit quoi", from his album It's All Love, released on his own label Sushiraw in 2003. Some of his biggest hits are "Love de toi", "One Love", "Question my heart", "Fiona", "Musiquarian" and many more...

Kaysha is also a music producer. He produced songs for Passi, Solaar, Jacob Desvarieux, Soumia, Elizio, Ludo, Vanda May, Aycee Jordanu and others.

He produced huge hits for other artists like "Deeper" & "Rebound Chick" for Nelson Freitas, "I like it" for Abege, "Close your eyes" for Djodje, "Ceu" & "Love again" for C4 Pedro, and many more hits

Kaysha is one of the first African artist to have been nominated in the MTV Europe Awards in 2005 for Best African Artist

He won a Kora award for best African Artist in 2000. He won a Kora award for best African Artist of the Diaspora in 2004 and 2005.

In 2015, he issued an Afro-house hit single, "Mama Kosa" featuring Central African, DJ and music producer, Boddhi Satva.

On 17 June 2019, Kaysha collaborated with Poison Mobutu, Mj30, Tutu Calugi, Nathalie Makoma, Noah Lunsi, Rebo Tchulo, Nzeté Sexy Chocolat Chaud and Oliverman on "Allez Les Leopards," a song composed for the 2019 Africa Cup of Nations to honor the Congolese football national team, dubbed Les Leopards.

== Discography ==
=== Albums ===
- 2017 : African Prince
- 2014: Alien Blood
- 2013: Christmas Collection
- 2013: Raw Like Sushi
- 2013: The Best of Love
- 2012: The Night EP
- 2011: Works of art
- 2009: Forever Young
- 2008: Kinshasa B Boy
- 2006: Legendary
- 2005: African Bohemian
- 2003: It's all Love
- 2000: Worldwidechico
- 1999: Black Sea Of Love
- 1998: Bounce Baby

=== Covers ===
- Be the one – 2018
- God's plan – 2018
- Rockstar – 2018
- Shape of you – 2017
- Stay – 2017
- Passion fruit – 2017
- Sexual Healing – 2015
- Hotline bling – 2015
- Hold On, We're Going Home – 2014
- Drunk in Love – 2014
- Diamonds – 2012
- Human Nature – 2011

=== Performances with others ===
- Dis l'heure de zouk – 2004
- Kimberlite Zouk Love – 2004
- Jocelin Demoumeaux's JDX – 2003
- Jean Michel Rotin's Solo – 1997
- X-Taz – 1996
- Grand Maquis – 2005

=== As producer | Writer | Composer | Executive producer ===
- Juan Magan : Echa Pa Aca (feat. Pitbull & Rich the Kid) – 2018 (Writer)
- Blaya : Vem na vibe – 2018 (Writer)
- Breyth : Supernova – 2018 (Writer, performer)
- No Maka feat. Blaya & Mc Zuka : Paula – 2017 (Writer)
- C4 Pedro : Ceu – 2016 (Producer)
- C4 Pedro & Sauti Sol – Love again – 2015 (Producer)
- Nelson Freitas : Life is Good – 2014 (Producer)
- Ricky Boy : Nem ceu nem mar (feat. Myriiam) – 2014 (Producer)
- Djodje : I won't stop the music – 2013 (Producer)
- William : Inside of you – 2013 (Producer)
- Aycee Jordan : You can't stop a revolution – 2012 (Producer, co-writer, executive producer)
- Vanda May : May Day – 2012 (Producer, co-writer, executive producer)
- Nelson Freitas : Rebound Chick – 2012 (Producer)
- Nelson Freitas : I just want my baby back – 2012 (Producer)
- Jamice : You – 2012 (Producer)
- Dannylys – I wanna do – 2012 (Producer, writer)
- Damogueez – I want it – 2012 (Producer)
- Ricky Boy : Eternamente – 2011 (Producer)
- Djodje : Bo e tudo feat. Chelsy Shantel – 2010 (Producer)
- Djodje : Close your eyes – 2010 (Producer)
- Nelson Freitas : Deeper – 2010 (Producer, co-writer)
- Nelson Freitas : Magia – 2010 (Producer)
- Loony Johnson : Backstage – 2009 (Producer, writer, executive producer)
- Isah: Black Madonna – 2009 (Producer, co-writer, executive producer)
- Kim : Feeling so good – 2009 (Producer, composer, writer)
- Marysa : You make me sexy – 2009 (Producer, composer, writer)
- Sandra Nanor : La seule Chose – 2009 (Producer, co-writer)
- Thayna: Nouveau Depart – 2008 (Producer, co-writer, executive producer)
- Mika Mendes: Mika Mendes – 2008 (Producer, co-writer, executive producer)
- Neuza : Secretly loving you – 2008 (Producer)
- Soumia: Confidences – 2008 (Producer, co-writer, executive producer)
- Elizio: Confirmacao – 2008 (Producer, co-writer, executive producer)
- Les Deesses – Saveurs Exotiques – 2007 (Producer, composer, writer)
- Les Deesses – On a changé – 2007 (Producer, composer, writer)
- Les Deesses – Danse avec moi – 2007 (Producer, composer, writer)
- Princess Lover : C Comme – 2007 (Producer)
- Abégé: C nou mem Again – 2007 (Producer, writer, executive producer)
- Loony Johnson : Loony Johnson – 2006 (Producer, writer, executive producer)
- Grand Maquis – 2005 (Producer, co-writer, executive producer)
- Elizio: Carpe Diem – 2005 (Producer, co-writer, executive producer)
- Soumia: In Love Again – 2005 (Producer, co-writer, executive producer)
- SR.Dancehall2K4 – 2004 (Producer, co-writer, executive producer)
- Teeyah: Métisse – 2004 (Producer, co-writer, executive producer)
- Hot Caribbean Miziks – 2004 (Producer, co-writer, executive producer)
- Elizio: Original di cabo verde – 2003 (Producer, co-writer, executive producer)
- Abégé: C nou mem – 2003 (Producer, co-writer, executive producer)
- Soumia: Still in Love – 2002 (Producer, co-writer, executive producer)
- Shydeeh : I won't give up – 2001 (Producer, co-writer)
- Shydeeh : The past (feat. Lynnsha) – 2001 (Producer, co-writer)
- CaribbeanSoul – 2001 (Producer, co-writer, executive producer)
