= Soldier Like Ma Papa =

Soldier like ma papa

Studio album by Stanley Enow
- Released: July 25, 2015
- Recorded: 2013–2015
- Genre: Hip-hop; ragga; reggae; R&B
- Label: Sony; Rockstar4000; Motherland Empire
- Producer: Martin Enow (exec.); Stanley Ebai Enow (exec.)

Singles from Soldier Like Ma Papa
- 1. "Hein Pere" Released: 2013; 2. "Tumbu Boss" Released: 2014; 3. "Njama Njama Cow" Released: 2014; 4. "King Kong" Released: 2015

Soldier Like Ma Papa is the debut studio album by Cameroonian rapper Stanley Enow. It was released in Cameroon on July 25, 2015 and worldwide on September 11, 2015. The album was distributed by Sony Music Entertainment via Rockstar4000. The album's title pays tribute to Enow's father, who is a veteran of the Cameroon Army. Soldier Like Ma Papa is predominantly hip-hop, but contains elements of ragga, reggae, R&B. It features guest appearances from Bill Muicha, Claude Ndam, Locko, 2Baba, Ice Prince, DJ Neptune, Biz Ice, Sarkodie and F.A.B.

== Track listing ==
No.	Title	Writer(s)	Producer(s)	Length
1.	"Commandant Zao"	Stanley Enow	Softouch	1:09
2.	"Hit the Road" (featuring Bill Muicha)	Enow; Bill Muchia	Cocaine OFT	4:38
3.	"Hein Pere"	Enow	Adamack	3:52
4.	"King Kong" (featuring DJ Neptune)	Enow	Softouch	4:24
5.	"Work Hard (Le Père Noel)"	Enow	Sox	3:55
6.	"Tumbuboss"	Enow	Cocaine OFT	4:07
7.	"Njama Njama Cow"	Enow	Softouch	3:29
8.	"Have a Dream" (featuring Bill Muicha)	Enow	Softouch	3:37
9.	"I'll Be Waiting"	Enow	Softouch	3:42
10.	"We are Hip Hop" (featuring Biz Ice)	Stanley enow; Biz Ice	Too High Roland	4:14
11.	"Bounce" (featuring Locko)	Enow; Locko	Softouch	3:32
12.	"Yours" (featuring Ice Prince)	Enow; Ice Prince	Sammy Gyang	4:42
13.	"Hein Pere (Remix)" (featuring F.A.B.)	Eenow; F.A.B.	Adamack	3:51
14.	"Njama Njama Cow (Remix)" (featuring Sarkodie)	Enow; Michael Owusu Addo	Softouch	3:29
15.	"Soul Letter"	Enow	Softouch	4:09
16.	"Love Song" (featuring Claude Ndam)	Enow; Claude Ndam	Seouddrums	4:37

Bonus track
No.	Title	Writer(s)	Producer(s)	Length
17.	"Tumbuboss Deluxe" (Stanley Enow)	Enow	Bebeto	4:07
18.	"How E Go Be" (2face Idibia)	Enow; 2face Idibia	Jay Sleek	3:38
