= Guchi (musician) =

Nigerian singer

- Born: Ugochi Lydia Onuoha; Kaduna, Nigeria
- Genres: Afropop
- Occupation: Singer
- Label: PG Records Entertainment

Ugochi Lydia Onuoha (born 1996 or 1997), known professionally as Guchi, is a Nigerian Afropop singer.

== Early life ==
Guchi is the second of four children; her family is from Mbaise in Imo State. She was born in Kaduna, in Kaduna State, but grew up in the capital city, Abuja. She began singing in her church choir and for her grandparents when she was seven, and cites Michael Jackson, a favourite of her father's, as an early influence. She began university studies at Edo State University; as of April 2019, after moving to Lagos, she was studying Theatre and Media Arts part-time at the University of Lagos.

== Career ==
She sings Afropop, as well as dance hall and high-life, and started her professional career in 2012.

Her debut single, "No Be Jazzy", was released in April 2019. After signing with PG Records Entertainment, she released "Addicted" later that year, followed by "Closer" and in October 2020, a 5-track EP including that song, I Am Guchi. In February 2021, she released "Jennifer", which inspired a viral challenge on TikTok and was re-released in June 2021 in a re-mixed version featuring the Tanzanian singer Rayvanny. In October 2021, "Benzema", titled for French footballer Karim Benzema, debuted at Number 3 on the Billboard Top Triller Global Chart. In 2022, she was featured on Rayvanny's "Sweet" and in March released "Shattered".

In January 2020, she became a two-year ambassador for the National Drug Law Enforcement Agency.

== Discography ==
=== Singles ===
Year	Song title	Album details
2019	"No Be Jazzy"	
2019	"Addicted"	
2021	"Benzema"	
2021	"Jennifer"	
2021	"Jennifer" (featuring) Rayvanny	
2022	"Shattered"	
2022

=== EP ===
Year	Title
2020	I Am Guchi

=== Music videos ===
Song title
"Jennifer"
"Benzema"
"Addicted"
"Peri-Peri"
"Closer"
American Love

== Awards and nominations ==
Year	Award ceremony	Award description	Result
2018	Prestige Entertainment	Best female artiste in Abuja	Won
2021	AFRIMA Awards	African Fan's Favourite	Nominated
2021	AEAUSA Awards	Best New Artist	Nominated
2023	The Headies	Rookie of the Year	Pending
