= Soundz (singer) =

Nigerian singer

- Born: Samuel Idowu Oluwadarasimi; Lagos
- Origin: Nigeria
- Genres: Afrofusion; afropop
- Occupations: Singer, songwriter, producer
- Years active: 2022–present
- Label: AfroNext Entertainment

Samuel Idowu Oluwadarasimi, better known by his stage name Soundz, is a Nigerian singer-songwriter and record producer signed to AfroNext Entertainment. He came into the music scene with an acclaimed extended play In The Rough, with the lead track "Attention" released in 2022. The song debuted at number 6 on TurnTable Afro-Pop Songs, and the extended play peaked at number 36 on TurnTable Top 50. In November 2022, he ranked number 80 on TurnTable Artiste Top 100.

== Career ==
In 2020, Soundz gain popularity as a record producer, singer, and songwriter; following the success of his song "Darasimi", which became popular on Triller Nigeria. The song title "Darasimi" was taken from his last name Oluwadarasimi, and his production tag "Wicked" gained popularity. On 11 December 2020, he went on to release "Cinderella", and the music video was released the following year on Apple Music. On 10 February 2022, he released "Personal" as the lead single off In The Rough, extended play.

On 27 July 2022, he released his first extended play In The Rough, which spawn a sleeper hit "Attention". However, it took four months for the song to gain mass popularity from TikTok and became a commercial success in Nigeria. On 24 October 2022, Soundz song "Attention" debuted on TurnTable Nigeria Top Afro-Pop Songs chart at number 6 and peaked at number 5 on 24 October. On 23 November 2022, he released the music video for "Attention", through AfroNext Entertainment, and directed by Pink.

On 26 December 2022, he told BellaNaija during their conversation about the creative process of his EP In The Rough; he says "I was going through a rough patch at the time, and I wanted my music to be a mirror of that, I wanted the world to feel how I felt, I titled the EP In The Rough because it signifies a person with so much unappreciated potential." On 23 January 2023, Pan African Music listed Soundz among other Nigerian artists to watch in 2023.

== Artistry ==
Soundz describes his style of music as Afropop, and RnB.

== Discography ==
=== EPs ===
List of EPs, with selected details, chart positions, and certifications
Title	Ep details	Peak chart positions	Certifications
Title	Ep details	NG	Certifications
In The Rough	Released: 27 July 2022; Label: AfroNext Entertainment; Formats: Digital download, streaming	36	

=== Singles ===
List of singles, showing title and year released with selected chart positions
Title	Year	Chart positions					Certifications	Album
Title	Year	NG	NG Afropop	UK	US	US Afrobeats	Certifications	Album
"Darasimi"	2020	—	—	—	—	—		TBA
"Cinderella"	2020	—	—	—	—	—		TBA
"Personal"	2022	—	—	—	—	—		In The Rough
"Fever" (with. Fave)	2023	—	—	—	—	—		TBA

=== As featured artist ===
List of singles as featured artist, with year released, selected chart positions, and album name shown
Title	Year	Chart positions					Certifications	Album
Title	Year	NG	NG Afropop	UK	US	US Afrobeats	Certifications	Album
"Drunk in Love" (Laycon featuring Soundz)	2021	—	—	—	—	—		I Am Laycon (The Original Soundtrack)

=== Other charted songs ===
List of other charted songs, with year released, selected chart positions, and album name shown
Title	Year	Chart positions					Certifications	Album
Title	Year	NG	NG Afropop	UK	US	US Afrobeats	Certifications	Album
"Attention"	2022	—	5	—	—	—		In The Rough
