= Joshua Baraka =

Ugandan singer (born 2004)

- Born: December 13, 2000 (age 25); Kawempe
- Origin: Kampala, Uganda
- Genre: Afro-beat
- Occupations: Musician, songwriter
- Instrument: vocal
- Years active: 2021
- Partner: Etania Mutoni (2022–present)

Joshua Baraka (born 13 December 2000, in Kawempe) is an international Ugandan recording artist and music producer and DJ with his DJ stage name as Carlos Lopez. He gained recognition with his single "Nana" in 2023 and hits like "Wrong Places"which he released in 2025 He has released more than four albums, including Baby Steps, Watershed,Recess and Juvie.

Due to his mother being a choir member he grew up with music at home . He lived in the tough Bwaise slum and later became a well-known musician in Uganda. In his career he has a big fanbase with notable fans like Derrick Ogwang, Victor Musika, and Kamba Joshua.

== Early life and education ==
Baraka was born on 13 December 2000, in Kawempe, Kampala district to a Kenyan father, Lawrence Okello Habalu and Ugandan mother. He began his primary education at various schools before completing it at Kitante Primary School. He attended Makerere College School for his O-level education and later pursued his A-level education at Mengo Senior School.

== Career ==
Baraka is a Ugandan singer-songwriter and multi-instrumentalist. His music incorporates elements of Afrobeat, R&B, dancehall, and Amapiano.

Baraka's interest in music developed at an early age, influenced by his mother, who was a worship leader. He learned to play instruments such as the piano and guitar. In August 2021, he released his debut EP, Baby Steps, a four-track project that included the single "Be Me."

In 2023, Baraka released the single "Nana," which gained attention and appeared on music charts in Uganda and other East African countries. Following the success of the song, he released the EP Growing Pains, which included collaborations with Nigerian artist Magixx, P.H.I.L.E.E and Ghanaian rapper Yaw Tog.

In 2024, Baraka expanded Growing Pains into a deluxe edition, adding new tracks. One of the additions was "Alone," an Amapiano-influenced song featuring South African vocalist Nkosazana Daughter.

Baraka was selected as a Spotify RADAR Africa artist, a program aimed at promoting emerging African musicians. He announced plans to release a full-length studio album in 2025.

Baraka was presented by Talent Africa Group for his inaugural concert. Titled "INTO THE BRAKA LAND," the event was scheduled for November 29, 2025, at the Ndeere Cultural Center in Kampala.

== Discography ==
=== Albums ===
- Baby Steps (2021)
- Growing Pains (Deluxe) (2024)
- Recess (2024)
- Juvie (2025)

=== EPs ===
- Growing Pains (Live) (2024)
- Growing Pains (2023)

=== Singles ===
- "Nana" (2023)
- "Dalilah" featuring Axon (2023)
- "Dalilah II" featuring Axon (2024)
- "Lonely" (2024)
- "Touch Me" (2024)
- "Digii IV" (2024)
- "Falling in Love" (2024)
- "Wrong Places" (2025)
- "Commando" featuring Tiwa Savage (2026)
- "Yoyo" (2026)
- "Morocco" featuring French Montana and Byron Messia (2026)
- "Jowo" (2026)
- "Army" (2026)
- "This Time" featuring Jae5 (2026)
- "Bebe" featuring Mr Eazi (2026)

=== Featured appearances ===
- "Touch Me" – Krizbeatz and FAVE (2024)
- "Fire" - Smallgod and Sarkodie
