= Nelson Freitas =

- Born: Nelson de Freitas; April 4, 1975 (age 51); Rotterdam, Netherlands
- Occupations: Singer, actor, producer, recorder
- Years active: 1997 - present
- Website: www.iamnelsonfreitas.com

Nelson Freitas (born April 4, 1975) is a Cape Verdean-Dutch Ghetto-Zouk singer, producer and recorder. He records with GhettoZouk Music, which also signed artists Chelsy Shantel and William Araujo.

== Biography ==
Freitas was born in the Netherlands to Cape Verdean parents. His music features Cape Verdean Zouk and R&B. His first record was with a boy's band called "Quatro Plus" (IV), a zouk/R&B band which was formed with Nilton Ramalho, Nelson Oliveira and Adilson Ben David.

The group released their first tracks on the album MOBASS presents..., "Hoje em Dia" ("Nowadays"), plus three albums 4-Voz (Four Voices) in 1998 including the single "Si bo cre", then as Quatro+ with Edson Freitas, his brother included. Bem Consché in 2002 (with additional singles that became hits including "Kazanga") and ("Última Viagem") ("Last Journey") in 2004.

Nelson released his first solo album, titled Magic, in October 2006, with songs in English and Cape Verdean Creole (some featuring Vanessa da Mata and Ben Harper). His second album, My Life, was released in 2010 and includes "Rebound Chick" and appearances by William Araujo, Mc Knowledje, Sanches Laisa and Anselmo Ralph. His third album was Elevate in 2013. Some tracks features C4 Pedro on "Bo Tem Mel", a Creole song; Djodje on "Bem Pa Mi" in another Creole song; Anselmo Ralph on "Drinks on Me" and Eddy Parker and Crucial in "All Upon You". The sixth track, "Simple Girl", featured a music video that was awarded Best Video at the 2013 Cabo Verde Music Awards.

His most recent release was Four, in 2016. Its tracks feature Portuguese singer Richie Campbell on "Break of Dawn"; another Cape Verdean singer, Mayra Andrade, on "Nha Baby"; Loony Johnson on "That's Why I Love You" and Mikkel Solnado on "In My Feelings", "Miúda Linda", its final track, is a remix.

Freitas is currently signed to the label named Believe.

== Discography ==
=== with "Quatro Plus" ===
1998	4 VôZ	1. Passa Sabe 3:41; 2. Agora Não 5:01; 3. Sentiments 5:24; 4. Katem Ninguem 5:40; 5. Interlude "Si Bu Kré" 0:50; 6. Si Bu Kré 4:15; 7. Favorit (Interlude) 2:33; 8. Ê So Bô 3:53; 9. Largam 5:06; 10. Hoje Em Dia 5:12; 11. Katem Ninguem (Instru) 5:40; 12. Hoje Em Dia (Sebas Remix) 4:32
2002	Bem Consché	1. Kazangá 5:53; 2. Sai da li 4:32; 3. Joia 5:00; 4. Margarita 4:50; 5. Bem consché 3:39; 6. Quatro ft Lizandro (Living Art) - Meninas bonitas 4:20; 7. Quatro ft Timmy - Dança ma mi 5:31; 8. Amam 3:55; 9. Nha manera 4:45; 10. Quatro ft Eunice - Ja bo bai 4:46
2006	Último Viagem	1. No ba 2:06; 2. Ritmo d'amor 3:55; 3. Sentimento pa bo 3:39; 4. Quatro ft Pedro Goncalves, Brazilio Almeida Freitas, Johnny Ramos, DJ Fantastic] DJ Nos Manera, Eunice Vieira - Miss Jane radio 3:18; 5. Angolana 4:18; 6. Nha flor 4:00; 7. Cré sabe 3:09; 8. Bem spiam la traz 4:27; 9. Quatro ft Laura aka (Melina) - Backstage 0:52; 10. Ca ten amor pa bo 4:33; 11. Quatro ft Nelson aka (Koeli) - Ca ten palavras suficiente 2:36; 12. Bo ké nha criola 3:48; 13. Completament 3:40; 14. Quatro ft S.O.S. & GMB - Rainha 4:03; 15. Intentada (bonus track)

=== Solo albums ===
2006	Magic	1. You're beautiful (Ft. Eddy Parke) (4:17); 2. Bo é nha melódia (4:52); 3. Faze amor ma bo (4:58); 4. Deeper (ft Kaysha) (4:14); 5. Só Mi Ku Bo (Ft. To Semedo) (4:50); 6. Um Desizão (3:43); 7. Love (Ft. Kygo) (4:01); 8. Love (Mikkel Solnado Remix) (Ft. Kygo) (4:33); 9. Baxa (4:00); 10. Bo é kel amjer (4:11); 11. True love (3:33); 12. Bia (4:22); 13. É Nha Situação (Ft. Raiz Funda) (4:36); 14. I’ve Got a Girl (3:47)
2010	My Life	1. Intro (0:23); 2. We're Doin It (3:02); 3. Na Bô Kaza (4:28); 4. Rebound Chick (4:36); 5. Otra Vês (4:10); 6. Nha Primere Amor (3:55); 7. I Just Want My Baby Back (4:31); 8. Chuva Pode Da (4:07); 9. Mind Of Its Own (5:08); 10. Blokióde (4:25); 11. Saia Branka (4:05); 12. My Life (3:47); 13. Sienna (3:47); 14. It's Over (4:58); 15. Let's Go (3:59)
2013	Elevate	1. - Something Good 4:10; 2. - Certeza 3:49; 3. - King of the World 4:05; 4. - Bo Tem Mel (feat. C4 Pedro) 4:58; 5. - I Love You 4:31; 6. - Simple Girl 4:09; 7. - Bem Pa Mi (feat. Djodje) 4:11; 8. - Sinti Sabe 4:32; 9. - Life Is Good 4:27; 10. - Drinks On Me (feat. Anselmo Ralph) 3:34; 11. - Broken Heart 3:56; 12. - All Upon You (feat. Eddy Parker, Crucial) 4:10; 13. - Menina 4:02; 14. - I Still Feel 4U 4:40
2016	Four	1. Beautiful Lie 4:18; 2. Miúda Linda 3:37; 3. Só Mais uma Vez 3:49; 4. Break of Dawn (feat. Richie Campbell) 3:34; 5. Nha Baby (feat. Mayra Andrade) 3:39; 6. My Heart 4:00; 7. That's Why I Love You (feat. Loony Johnson) 3:32; 8. In My Feelings (feat. Mikkel Solnado) 3:11; 9. Um Cre Amabo 3:23; 10. Ride or Die 3:46; 11. This Love 3:37; 12. Miúda Linda (Remix) 3:26
2021	Dpos d’Quarentena	1. Chocolate 3:10; 2. Plena (feat. Julinho KSD) 3:38; 3. Big On You 2:50; 4. Tellin Me Something (feat. Mr Eazi) 2:47; 5. Dor d'um Kriolu (with June Freedom) 2:45; 6. Kutelo 2:36; 7. Dpos d’Quarentena 2:54; 8. Pôlimé (feat. Tabanka Djaz) 3:46; 9. Vai Dar Choque (feat. Dino D'Santiago & Rony Fuego) 2:53; 10. All Over The World (feat. C-Mart & Positivv) 2:54; 11. Na Bo Mon (feat. Neyna) 3:22

=== Other titles ===
- "Sienna" (single released in 2010, unreleased)
- "For You" (title released in 2014, unreleased)
- "Miúda Linda" (title released in 2015, unrecorded)
- "Break of Dawn" ft. Richie Campbell (title released in 2016, unreleased)

=== Collections and compilations ===
2008	The Best of Nelson Freitas 2006/2008 (2-CD set)	1. Ooh Coração (inédit); 2. Babe Sjam Kakre Bo Love; 3. You're So Hot; 4. Spjam Dint Nhas Oi (unreleased); 5. Cré Sabe 2008 Feat. Carlos Silva & Quatro +; 6. Joia; 7. Bo é Kel Amjer; 8. Deeper Feat. Kaysha; 9. Bo & Nha Meodia; 10. Faze Amor Ma Bo; 11. You're Beautiful Feat. Eddy Parker; 12. Um Desizão
2011	My Zouk Hits	1. I Wish; 2. How It Used to Be (Feat. Vanda May); 3. Rebound Chick; 4. Mind of Its Own; 5. Deeper (Feat. Kaysha); 6. I've Got a Girl; 7. It's Over; 8. My Life; 9. I Just Want My Baby Back; 10. True Love

=== Collaborations ===
- Carlos Silva ft Nelson Freitas & Eddie Parker - Mystery
- Carlos Silva ft Nelson Freitas & Q-Plus - Cré Sabe 2008
- Atim - Crazy (ft Nelson Freitas)
- Atim - Amor E Bo (ft Nelson Freitas)
- Leroy Styles ft Nelson Freitas - Tao Sabe
- Anselmo Ralph - Assumir Barulho ft. Nelson Freitas (2009)
- Anselmo Ralph - Atira Água Ft Nelson Freitas & Eddy Parke (2012)
- Mark. G & The Heavy Hitters - I Wish (ft Nelson Freitas)
- Just Jay ft Nelson Freitas: One Night Stand
- Baby ft Kempi & Nelson Freitas - Meisje Zonder Naam
- Kizomba Brasil, 2 duos with Chelsy Shantel: Boa Sorte (Good Luck) (song by Vanessa da Mata & Ben Harper) and Amor Perfeito (2008)
- Eddu ft Nelson Freitas - N'cre xinti bu corpo (2008)
- Team De Sonh: Big Nelo ft Nelson Freitas - Ela é (2012), title which Freitas recorded in the solo under the title "King Of The World"
- Johnny Ramos ft Nelson Freitas - One Night Stand
- Stony - Let's Do It Now (ft Nelson Freitas) (zouk 2012)
- TLDreamZ - Sem Bu Amor (ft Nelson Freitas) (Album Press Play, 2012)
- Jennifer Dias - Deixam em paz (ft Nelson Freitas) (remix)
- Kaysha ft Nelson Freitas & Big Nelo - She's Dangerous (2013)
- Chachi Carvalho - So Fly ft Nelson Freitas
- Dji Tafinha - Vou Te Dar ft Ary & Nelson Freitas (2014)
- C4 Pedro ft. Nelson Freitas: Come Right Now (2015)
- William Araujo - Calor Ki Ta Mata (ft. Nelson Freitas & Broederliefde) [Verão Azul] (2016)
- Kaysha feat. Nelson Freitas - I Will (Tarraxinha) (2017)
- Telma Lee - Esta dificil (feat. Nelson Freitas ) (2017)
- June Freedom & Nelson Freitas - Dor d'um Kriolu (2020)
