= Les Déesses =

- Origin: France, Antilles
- Genres: Zouk, R&B, Pop
- Years active: 2007–2008
- Labels: M6 Interactions; Nouvelle Donne Music
- Past members: Lylah; Edene; Philypa
- Website: Official myspace page

Les Déesses (French: the goddesses) were a French zouk and R&B girl group best known for their 2007 summer hit "On a changé".

== History ==
Les Déesses originally come from the Caribbean and Africa. Lylah's parents come from Martinique and Guadeloupe, Edene's parents come from Guadeloupe and Philypa is from Cameroon. The three girls met on a dance casting and decided to form a tropical music and R&B group.

In July 2007, the group released a first single, "On a changé" (We have changed), which debuted at #9 on the SNEP Single Charts and peaked at #5. It stayed in the Top 100 for 21 weeks.

A second single, "Danse avec moi" (Dance with me) was announced for November, but the physical release was cancelled.

On October 29, their debut album "Saveurs exotiques" (Exotic flavours) was released, and in February 2008, a third single with the same name peaked at #11 on the French Single Charts.

On March 8, they gave a concert at the Bataclan in Paris, where they were joined onstage by Amine and Singuila.

In July 2008, the group announced their separation due to disagreements with their producers. Lylah started a solo career, releasing a single, "Ne t'arrête pas" (Don't stop) and an album, "Avec ou sans toi" (With or without you). Phylipa also recorded a song, "We Gonna Fight".

== Name ==
"Les Déesses" is French for "The Goddesses". Every member of the group represents one goddess:

- Lylah, the lead singer, represents Venus, the Ancient Roman goddess of beauty and love, because "she is a rare pearl with a sweet and warm voice which perfectly reveals her personality".
- Edene represents Diana, the Roman goddess of the hunt, because "she is ambitious and dynamic and her beauty and charm confer her a particular ease on stage".
- Philypa incarnates Minerva, the Roman goddess of wisdom, science and art, because "she is suave and reserved and totally reveals herself on stage".

== Discography ==
=== Albums ===
Year	Album	Peak (FR)
2007	Saveurs exotiques	39

=== Singles ===
Year	Single	Peak Position				Album
Year	Single	FR	FR (DL)^{1}	FR Club	BEL^{2}	Album
2007	On a changé	5	31	19	34	Saveurs exotiques
2007	Danse avec moi (feat. Papa Tank)	—	—	10	—	Saveurs exotiques
2008	Saveurs exotiques (feat. Myma Mendhy)	11	—	15	—	Saveurs exotiques

^{1} French Digital Charts
^{2} Belgian (Wallonia) Singles Chart
