= Mika Mendes =

French kizomba/zouk singer (born 1982)

- Born: Mikael Mendes; 2 July 1982 (age 44); Nice, France
- Occupation: Singer
- Years active: 2001-present

Mickael (Mika) Mendes (born 2 July 1982) is a Cape Verdean-French Ghetto-Zouk singer. He was born in Nice, France. His father is Boy Gê Mendes former lead singer of the famous Capeverdean group Cabo Verde Show and later part of the band Mendes e Mendes.

== Career ==
Mika first entered the music world in 2001 when he participated in the Cape Verdean music compilation Aliança.

From 2002 to 2004 he participated in several albums, working with such famous recording artists as Philip Monteiro (album Philip Monteiro and friends (2004), track "Falta d'atencao" featuring AN2 & Mickael.

In 2004 he and Paulo Tavares released the album Paulo & Mika recorded at Rotterdam Mika's father is a Capeverdean born in Dakar, Senegal (Gérard 'Boy Gê' Mendes).

In 2005, he took part in a new compilation of the second volume of Aliança with two titles: Tempo (Mickael featuring Patrick Peck) and Flan (Djedje featuring Zico and Mickael).

In 2006 he was contacted by Nichols to record a track on the album Marcia by the artist of the same name. The song “N kré” was well received, which only raised his profile in the music industry.

He also recorded a track with Jamice: "Nha Princesa" on the album Suave (2007).

In 2008 Mika signed with Kaysha’s Sushiraw label, where he recorded his debut album, Mika Mendes, released in July that year.

He created the Real-Touch label in 2010 and he released My Inspiration in spring 2011 with his brother Djavan. He later made a concert in London to promote his album.

He attended the Cape Verde African Festival on 13 July 2013.

== Discography ==
=== Albums ===
==== Paulo Tavares & Mika Mendes - New Style (2006) ====
1. Mickael Mendes - Linda Bo é (featured on Mika Mendes album (2008))
2. Paulo Tavares - Dona Di Nha Coração
3. Mickael Mendes - Kel Dia
4. Paulo Tavares - So Bo
5. Paulo Tavares - Festa Bedju
6. Mickael Mendes - Amour Secret
7. Paulo Tavares - Leia
8. Mickael Mendes - Te quiero
9. Paulo Tavares - Forti tchora
10. Mickael Mendes - Dam Bo Amor (featured on Mika Mendes album (2008))

==== Mika Mendes (2008) ====
1. Dimensão 4:01
2. Criola 4:44
3. Show Me the Way 4:11
4. Poco Di Bo (feat. Kaysha) 3:59
5. Coracão Blues 4:47
6. Let Me Be the One 4:30
7. Dam Bo Amor 4:29 (from his previous album)
8. Pardonne Moi 4:15
9. Amor 4:01
10. You're the One I Need (feat. Elizio & Kaysha) 3:45
11. Attracão 4:21
12. Lembra 3:59
13. Dis Moi Que Tu M'aimes (feat. Shana) 4:09
14. Linda Bo E 4:39 (from his previous album)
15. N'oublie Pas 3:42

==== My Inspiration (2011) ====
1. Vivé ma bo 3:42
2. So 1 momento 3:59
3. So Sexy 4:07
4. Flor di vento 3:57
5. Give Me (feat. Nichols) 3:55
6. Atravez di bo 4:02
7. Entre nous 4:05
8. Nova dansa 4:11
9. Tell Me Baby (feat. Chachi) 3:56
10. Tcham bai 3:51
11. Lina 3:56
12. Bo e nha (Remix club) 3:54
13. 1 noite ma mi 3:30
14. Tempo 3:37

==== Sem Limite (2013) ====
1. Nha Numero 1 3:53
2. Sem Limite (feat. Maryza) 3:44
3. Nao para (feat. Atim, Elji) 3:45
4. Poder D'amor 4:00
5. Magico 3:57
6. Quero Te Provar 3:47
7. Agora 3:33
8. Mas Perto (feat. Léa) 3:39
9. Estranha (feat. P-Lowe) 4:29
10. Tenta Outra Vez (feat. Neuza) 3:35
11. Fais ton choix 3:32
12. Cv Feeling (feat. Elji) 3:54
13. Quero Te Provar (Acoustic) 3:47

==== Timeless (2014) ====
1. Meu Bem
2. Cada Vez Mais
3. Vem
4. Kiz-U
5. Let Me Show You
6. Miss Future (feat. Elji Beatzkilla)
7. Dexan (feat. Djodje)
8. I Want It (feat. Dina Mendes)
9. Bonnie and Clyde (feat. Saaphy)
10. Sozinho (feat. P.Lowe)
11. Poder D'Amor
12. Magico
13. Agora (Remix)

==== Visão (2016) ====
1. Visão 3:26
2. Rainha (feat. Elji Beatzkilla) 3:55
3. Perdido 3:38
4. Sem Fim 2:46
5. Diferente (feat. Telma Lee) 4:23
6. Come Closer (feat. P-Lowe) 3:36
7. Comigo (feat. B.A.D.) 3:34
8. Apaixonado (feat. Claudio Ismael) 3:34
9. Eu Quero (feat. Djodje) 3:36
10. Vá-Lá 3:31
11. Chama Meu Nome (feat. Real'or'Beatz) 3:34
12. Dexan (feat. Djodje) 3:44
13. Cada Vez Mais 3:36

==== Mistério I (2019) ====
1. Intro 0:48
2. Vontade Imensa 3:30
3. Deixa-Te Levar 3:23
4. Ja Chega 3:17
5. Medusa 3:14
6. Bo e Di meu 3:18
7. Me Pega Assim 3:10
8. Pronto Para Te Dar 3:25

=== Other songs ===
- Tempo (Mickael featuring Patrick Peck), in the compilation Aliança volume 2 (2005)
- Encosta et Quale Manera in the compilation Amigo do Amigo - Homenagem ao Povo Angolano (2008)
- Expressa Amor in the compilation Soulzouk 2
- Sonho feliz in the compilation Zouk Only 2009
- So nos dos in the compilation Zoukonline 2011
- Magico (2011) (single), then featured in the album Sem Limite
- Bonnie and Clyde: Mika Mendes & Saaphy (2014)
- Vá lá (2015)
- "Eu quero" feat. Djodje (2016)
- By DJs:
  - |Mashups by DJ Edu on BBC Radio 1Xtra (2012)
    - Mika Mendes vs Beyoncé – Lina Vs Party
    - Mika Mendes vs Bruno Mars – Tcham Bai Vs It Will rain
    - Mika Mendes vs Beyoncé – Atravez Di Bio Vs Countdown
    - Mika Mendes – Dimensao vs Trey Songz – Unusual
  - Magico, So 1 momento and So Sexy: a cappella versions (2013)

=== Featurings ===
- Philip Monteiro feat. AN2: Falta d'atencao (album Philip Monteiro and friends) (2004)
- Flan (Djedje featuring Zico et Mickael) in the compilation Aliança volume 2 (2005)
- Marcia: N kré (2006)
- Jamice: Nha Princesa (album Suave) (2007)
- Jamice: Romancia
- Neuza: Cinderella (2008)
- Rei Helder: Apaga a Luz (2008)
- Paulo Tavares: Sensualmente (album Nha Love É Bo) (2009)
- Elizio: Sex (2010)
- MarkG and the Heavy Hitters: Bo é nha (2010)
- DjéDjé feat. Mika Mendes & D. Lopes: Lembra Tempo (2010)
- Edson Dani feat. Mika Mendes - Livre
- Elizio: Put It Down (2011)
- Isah: Tudu Di Mi (2011)
- Atim: Bem (2012)
- Criol Connection: Dam Certeza (album Double C) (2012)
- G-Amado: Alguen Ki Un Gosta and Hora Ki Bo Pega Fogo (2012)
- DJ Pausas: Perde Control (album All Night Long) (2012)
- Léa: Mas Perto (2012), then featured in the album Sem Limite (2013)
- Rei Helder ft. Mika Mendes: Entra Na Mi (2013)
- Kaysha - Poison (feat. Mika Mendes & Loony Johnson) (2014)
- Ravidson feat. Mika Mendes - Parar o tempo (2015)
- DJ Samuka feat. Mika Mendes & 2Much - Atenção (2015)

=== Music videos ===
- Show Me The Way
- Dimensao
- I Want You
- Tenta outra vez (feat Neuza)
- Cada Vez Mais
