= TurnTable End of the Year Top 50 of 2020 =

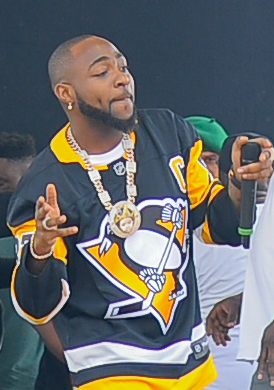
Davido top charted artist of 2020

The TurnTable End of the Year Top 50 of 2020 is a chart that ranks the best-performing singles in Nigeria. Its data, published by TurnTable magazine, is based collectively on each single's weekly physical and digital sales, as well as airplay and streaming. At the end of a year, TurnTable publishes an annual list of the 50 most successful songs throughout that year on its top 50 charts based on the information. The 2020 edition was published on 30 December 2020, calculated with data from 1 January to 14 December 2020.

== History ==
On 9 November 2021, TurnTable Co-Editor-in-Chief Ayomide Oriowo released the highlight of TurnTable's Top 50 in 2020. Davido made a number of achievements on the chart from 16 November to 14 December. He became the first artist to occupy the first four spots on the chart. He also became the first artist to replace themselves at number 1, with "Fem", "Holy Ground", "The Best", and "Jowo".

DJ Neptune's "No Body", became 2020's top song, top radio song, top airplay song (radio and television), top song by a duo/collaboration, and top Afro-pop song. Davido became 2020's top artist, top television artist, top streaming artist, top YouTube artist, top Audiomack artist, top male artist, top Afro-pop artist, and his song "Fem" became the top song by a male artist. Burna Boy became 2020's top radio artist, top Shazam artist, and top songwriter of 2020. Simi's "Duduke" became top television song, top YouTube song, top song by female artist, top R&B song, and she became the top female artist of 2020. Omah Lay's "Bad Influence" became top streaming song, top Boomplay song, top Audiomack song, top Apple Music song, top digital song, and top Shazam song. Mayorkun became top Triller artist, and his song "Geng" became top Triller song. Fireboy DML became top Boomplay artist, and top R&B artist. Ladipoe's "Know You" became top hip-hop/rap song of 2020.

Cheque's "Zoom" became the top melodic rap/trap song of 2020. Olamide became top hip-hop/rap artist of 2020. Tems became top alternative artist, and her song "Damages" became top alternative song of 2020. Mercy Chinwo became the top gospel artist, and her song "Obinasom" became the top gospel song of 2020. Master KG "Jerusalema (remix)" became top international song, and top African radio song of 2020. The Weeknd's "Blinding Lights" became top international radio song. Drake became top international artist, and his song "Toosie Slide" became the top international television song of 2020. BTS became the top international group/duo of 2020. Nasty C's "There They Go" became top African television song of 2020. Ed Sheeran's "Thinking Out Loud" and Styl-Plus's "Olufunmi" became the top catalog radio songs of the last five years. Grammy Award Afrobeat producer Telz became top producer of 2020.

== Year-end list ==
List of songs on TurnTable's 2020 Year-End Top 50 chart
No.	Title	Artist(s)
1	"Nobody"	Dj Neptune
2	"Fem"	Davido
3	"Abule"	Patoranking
4	"Jerusalema"	Master KG
5	"Duduke"	Simi
6	"Something Different"	Adekunle Gold
7	"Again"	Wande Coal
8	"Vibration"	Fireboy DML
9	"Bad Influence"	Omah Lay
10	"Lo Lo"	Omah Lay
11	"Woman"	Rema
12	"Pami"	DJ Tunez
13	"Beamer (Bad Boys)"	Rema and Rvssian
14	"Betty Butter"	Mayorkun
15	"Wonderful"	Burna Boy
16	"In My Maserati"	Olakira
17	"Mad"	Sarz and WurlD
18	"Ginger Me"	Rema
19	"Zoom"	Cheque
20	"Geng"	Mayorkun
21	"MJ"	Bad Boy Timz
22	"Risky"	Davido
23	"Ojoro"	Terri
24	"Away"	Oxlade
25	"Call"	Joeboy
26	"Damn"	Omah Lay
27	"Infinity"	Olamide
28	"Intentions"	Justin Bieber
29	"You"	Omah Lay
30	"Damages"	Tems
31	"Jaho"	Kizz Daniel
32	"Odogwu"	Burna Boy
33	"Blinding Lights"	The Weeknd
34	"Billionaire"	Teni
35	"Know You"	Ladipoe
36	"Bop Daddy"	Falz
37	"AG Baby"	Adekunle Gold
38	"Koroba"	Tiwa Savage
39	"Way Too Big"	Burna Boy
40	"Say So"	Doja Cat
41	"Rora"	Reekado Banks
42	"Toosie Slide"	Drake
43	"New York City Girl"	Fireboy DML
44	"Shekere"	Yemi Alade
45	"Ada"	Kizz Daniel
46	"Laugh Now Cry Later"	Drake
47	"Monsters You Made"	Burna Boy
48	"Beginning"	Joeboy
49	"Yummy"	Justin Bieber
50	"Of Lagos"	Mayorkun
