= Small Doctor =

Nigerian Fuji, afro-pop recording artist and performer

- Born: Adekunle Temitope; 27 May 1996 (age 30); Lagos, Nigeria
- Origin: Ondo State
- Genres: Afrobeats; afropop; Fuji
- Occupations: Singer, songwriter and performer
- Instruments: Vocals; singing
- Years active: 2012–present
- Label: OIT Dynasty Records

Adekunle Temitope (born 27 May 1996), better known by his stage name Small Doctor, is a Nigerian Fuji, afro-pop recording artist and performer. Small Doctor was preceded by the release of another single: "Penalty" which won award for the "Best Street Hop" at The Headies 2018. His songs are mostly composed in English, pidgin and Yoruba.

== Early life and education ==
Temitope was born on 27 May 1996 in Dopemu, Lagos State, but hails from Ondo State. He took a strong interest in music at a young age. He began his education at Orosan Nursery and Primary School Lagos, and later proceeded to Oniwaya Secondary School. Due to his interest in music, he dropped out of University of Lagos to concentrate on full time music.

== Career ==
In 2012, his music career kicked off. He released singles like Gbagaun, Anobi, Penalty and Mosquito Killer.

On 24 July 2015, Small Doctor released his debut studio album "Street Ambassador". The album features guest appearances from Pasuma, Dre San and Young Legxy.

Small Doctor embarked on his first major tour in Nigeria titled "Omo Better Concert" on 9 December 2018. He performed at the 20,000 seats capacity Agege Stadium in Lagos. He performed in London at a concert held at O2 Academy Islington on 9 September 2018.

On 6 April 2019, Winners Golden Bet unveiled Small Doctor as their brand ambassador.

== Personal life ==
On 3 December 2018 Small Doctor was arrested for alleged possession of firearms and for allegedly threatening to shoot a police officer who was on traffic duty along Oshodi, Lagos. Barely 24 hours, a magistrate court in Ebute cleared all charges against him and he was released.

== Discography ==
=== Albums ===
- 2015: Street Ambassador
- 2015: Omo Iya Teacher
- 2016: Street King

=== Singles ===
- 2015: "Skit"
- 2015: "Oh My God"
- 2015: "E No Sabi"
- 2015: "Gyration"
- 2015: "Magician"
- 2015: "Amuludun"
- 2015: "Say Baba"
- 2015: "Oyinbo"
- 2015: "Eleda Mi"
- 2015: "God the Bless"
- 2015: "Street Bus Stop"
- 2015: "Arrest"
- 2015: "Small Doctor"
- 2015: "Omo Iya Teacher"
- 2015: "Ile Ijo"
- 2015: "Story"
- 2015: "Gbera"
- 2015: "Gbagaun"
- 2015: "Iya Teacher"
- 2015: "You Know"
- 2015: "Anobi"
- 2015: "Mosquito Killer"
- 2015: "Uzobu"
- 2015: "Anobi"
- 2016: "Penalty"
- 2016: "Sobotone"
- 2016: "Forever"
- 2016: "Pakurumo"
- 2018: "My People"
- 2018: "Slay Mama"
- 2018: "Thank You"
- 2019: "Believe"
- 2020: "Account Balance"

== Awards and nominations ==
Year	Award ceremony	Prize	Result
2017	City People Entertainment Awards	Street Music of The Year	Won
2015	City People Entertainment Awards	Indigenous Artiste of The Year	Won
2016	Nigeria Music Video Awards (NMVA)	Best Video by a New Artiste	Won
2018	Nigeria Entertainment Awards	Best New Act	Won
2018	The Headies	Best Street Hop Artiste	Won
