= TurnTable End of the Year Top 50 of 2021 =

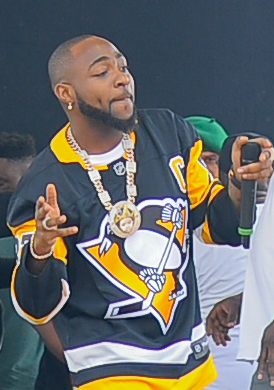
Davido top charted artist of 2021

The TurnTable End of the Year Top 50 of 2021 is a chart that ranks the best-performing singles in Nigeria. Its data, published by TurnTable magazine, is based collectively on each single's weekly physical and digital sales, as well as airplay and streaming. At the end of a year, TurnTable publishes an annual list of the 50 most successful songs throughout that year on its top 50 charts based on the information published on 30, and 31 December 2021 in TurnTable, and calculated with data from January 4, 2021, to December 13, 2021.

TurnTable, Clout Africa, and Triller hosted an End Year roundtable countdown. The year-end countdown was broadcast live on 27 December, and 28 December at 18:00 WAT on Triller TV. Its first roundtable edition features includes Chuka Obi, Fawehinmi “Foza” Oyinkansola, Daniel Owolabi, Titi Adesanya, Adeayo Adebiyi, Ini Baderinwa, Edwin Okolo, and Kolapo Oladapo on its two episodes.

== History ==
On 30 December 2021, TurnTable magazine editors Kayode Babatola and Temitope Babatola released the highlights of the TurnTable Top 50 in 2021. Davido emerged as artist of the year in 2021, for the second time in a role, after leading TurnTable End of the Year Top 50 of 2020. Omah Lay became 2021 top songwriter, and his song "Godly", became 2021 top song of the year, top YouTube song, top Afro-pop song, top Nigerian song on Kenya radio, top Boomplay song, and top television song. CKay's "Love Nwantiti" was the top global Nigerian song of 2021.

Cheque, and Fireboy DML "History", became 2021's top melodic Rap/Trap song. Ladipoe, and Buju "Feeling", became 2021's Hip-Hop/Rap song, top Spotify song, and top Audiomack song. Olamide, became 2021's top Hip-Hop/Rap artist, top Audiomack artist, and top Boomplay artist. Davido became 2021's top YouTube artist, top Afro-pop artist, top airplay artist, top television artist, and top radio artist. Fave "Baby Riddim" became 2021's top song by emerging artist. Dai Verse's "Your Body (Cocaine)" became 2021's top song by an emerging artist (male). Seyi Vibez became 2021 top emerging artist. Wizkid became 2021's top Apple Music artist, and his song "Essence" became top R&B song, top Nigerian song on South Africa radio, and top Apple Music song. Wizkid's "Ojuelegba" became 2021's top catalog radio song (Nigeria).

Chike became 2021's top R&B artist. Tems became 2021's top Alternative artist, and her song "Damages" became 2021's top Alternative song. DJ Kaywise "High Way", became 2021's top Airplay song, and top Radio song. Mariah Carey "All I Want for Christmas Is You" became 2021's top catalog radio song (International). Burna Boy "Anybody" became 2021's top Nigeria song on Tanzania radio. Patoranking "Abule" became 2021's top Nigeria song on Ghana radio. King Promise "Slow Down" became 2021's top African television song. Jae5 "Dimension" became 2021's top International television song. Gyakie "Forvever (remix)" became 2021's top African song (radio), and top International song.

Justin Bieber became 2021's top International artist, and his song "Peaches" became top International radio song. K1 De Ultimate "Adé Orí Òkin" became 2021's top traditional song. The Cavemen became 2021's top Traditional artist. Silk Sonic (Bruno Mars and Anderson .Paak) became 2021's Top International group/Duo. KCee became 2021's top Gospel Artist, and his song "Cultural Praise Volume 1" became top Gospel song. Ruger "Bounce" became 2021's top Deezer song. Dangbana Republik and Bella Shmurda's "Rush" became 2021's top Triller song. Joeboy became 2021's top Triller artist. Kizz Daniel "Lie" became 2021's top TikTok song. Tempoe became 2021's top producer.

== Year-end list ==
List of songs on TurnTable's 2021 Year-End Top 50 chart
| No. | Title | Artist(s) |
|---|---|---|
| 1 | "Godly" | Omah Lay |
| 2 | "Feeling" | Ladipoe and Buju |
| 3 | "Essence" | Wizkid |
| 4 | "Understand" | Omah Lay |
| 5 | "Rock" | Olamide |
| 6 | "Lie" | Kizz Daniel |
| 7 | "High Way" | DJ Kaywise |
| 8 | "Peru" | Fireboy DML |
| 9 | "Sip (Alcohol)" | Joeboy |
| 10 | "Bloody Samaritan" | Ayra Starr |
| 11 | "High" | Adekunle Gold |
| 12 | "For You" | Teni |
| 13 | "Forever (Remix)" | Gyakie and Omah Lay |
| 14 | "The Best" | Davido |
| 15 | "Infinity" | Olamide |
| 16 | "Running (To You)" | Chike |
| 17 | "KPK (Ko Por Ke)" | Rexxie and Mohbad |
| 18 | "Cash App" | Bella Shmurda |
| 19 | "Ginger" | Wizkid |
| 20 | "Bounce" | Ruger |
| 21 | "Focus" | Joeboy |
| 22 | "Kilometre" | Burna Boy |
| 23 | "Monalisa" | Lojay and Sarz |
| 24 | "Pronto" | Ajebo Hustlers |
| 25 | "Felony" | CKay |
| 26 | "Sinner" | Adekunle Gold |
| 27 | "Jowo" | Davido |
| 28 | "History" | Cheque |
| 29 | "Peaches" | Justin Bieber |
| 30 | "Kilofeshe" | Zinoleesky |
| 31 | "Hallelu" | Masterkraft, Zlatan and Bella Shmurda |
| 32 | "Loading" | Olamide |
| 33 | "Rush" | Dangbana Republik and Bella Shmurda |
| 34 | "Show Me" | Joeboy |
| 35 | "Outside" | Buju |
| 36 | "Feel Good" | MohBad |
| 37 | "Big Thug Boys" | AV |
| 38 | "Koleyewon" | Naira Marley |
| 39 | "Somebody's Son" | Tiwa Savage featuring Brandy |
| 40 | "Bling" | Blaqbonez |
| 41 | "Coming" | Naira Marley and Busiswa |
| 42 | "Away" | Ayra Starr |
| 43 | "Celebrate Me" | Patoranking |
| 44 | "Squander" | Falz |
| 45 | "Dimension" | Jae5 |
| 46 | "World" | Dangbana Republik and Bella Shmurda |
| 47 | "It Is What It Is" | Adekunle Gold |
| 48 | "KOLO" | Ice Prince |
| 49 | "Soundgasm" | Rema |
| 50 | "Triumphant" | Olamide |
