= Protect Sarz at All Costs =

Studio album by Sarz
- Released: 26 September 2025
- Genre: Afro fusion
- Length: 34:44
- Label: 1789
- Producer: Sarz

Sarz chronology
Memories That Last Forever 2 (2023)	Protect Sarz at All Costs (2025)	The Game Needs Us (2026)

Singles from Protect Sarz at All Costs
- 1. "Happiness" Released: 8 December 2023; 2. "Billions" Released: 17 May 2024

Protect Sarz at All Costs is the debut studio album by Nigerian record producer Sarz, released on 26 September 2025 by his independent record label, 1789. The album, comprising twelve tracks, is primarily afro-fusion, but also features elements of EDM, amapiano, dancehall, hip-hop, house, afroswing, R&B and alté. It features guest appearances from Asake, Wizkid, Gunna, Fireboy DML, Lojay, Joeboy, Victony, Teni, Libianca, Wurld, Skillibeng, Odumodublvck, Shallipopi, Theodora, Zeina, and the Ndlovu Youth Choir. Protect Sarz at All Costs serves as a follow-up to Memories That Last Forever 2 (2023), a compilation album he made with the Sarz Academy.

== Background and promotion ==
Sarz announced Protect Sarz at All Costs with a release date of 26 September 2025, accompanied by a cover art showing him in silhouette against a red background. Initially, the album was set to feature artists like Ayra Starr and Big Sean, however, that was not the case. Its track listing was revealed on 24 September 2025. Before its release, Sarz shared a series of promotional videos. One depicted a mock press conference in which he was asked about the release date and potential appearances from Wizkid, Burna Boy, and Davido; other videos included a fan discussion and a short scene with comedian Layi Wasabi.

The album follows Sarz's previous projects as a lead artist and collaborator, including his Sarz Is Not Your Mate EP (2019), the Memories That Last Forever 2 compilation (2023), the LV N ATTN EP with Lojay (2021), and the Sweetness EP with Obongjayar (2021).

== Singles ==
The Asake and Gunna-assisted "Happiness" was released as the album's lead single on 8 December 2023, and blends elements of Afrobeats and hip-hop. The music video, directed by Edgar Esteves, shows vibrant visuals with natural elements, dancing, and fashion styling. "Happiness" was ranked 24th on Billboard's 2024 Year-End U.S. Afrobeats Songs list. Sarz earned a nomination for Producer of the Year at the 17th edition of The Headies for the song. The album's second single, "Billions", features frequent collaborator Lojay and 17 May 2024. The song starts with light piano and percussion, then builds into a lively, danceable beat. Its release was accompanied by a performance video, directed by Kelvin Jones. Lojay won Best Vocal Performance (Male) at The Headies 2024 for "Billions"; the song also received a nomination for Best Recording of the Year at the event.

== Composition ==
Protect Sarz at All Costs blends genres like Afropop, amapiano, house, dancehall, and R&B. The album opens with "Grateful", featuring Wurld and the Ndlovu Youth Choir, built around acoustic guitar and layered harmonies. "Happiness", with Asake and Gunna, is driven by log drums and percussion, while "Getting Paid" brings together Asake, Wizkid, and Skillibeng, sampling Toumani Diabaté's "Jarabi" and incorporating Yoruba and patois. "Mademoiselle" is a dancehall track featuring Odumodublvck, Shallipopi, Theodora, and Zeina, while "BMF" features Fireboy DML and Byron Messia over 1990s-style R&B production. The album closes with the house-influenced "Up", featuring Victony, and "Billions", described by The Native's Patrick Ezema as a reworked version of Sarz and Lojay's earlier collaboration.

== Critical reception ==
Professional ratings
Review scores
Source	Rating
Afrocritik	6.9/10
The Native	6.9/10
Pulse Nigeria	8.5/10

Jason Okundaye of The Guardian called Protect Sarz at All Costs a "momentous, Black diaspora-surfing debut," writing that Sarz "lays a solid claim to the title of Nigeria’s most deft curator and enchanter of swinging hips." He described the album as "genre-fluid" and concluded that it "doesn’t mark an arrival, but an assertion of his prodigious talent." Mankaprr Conteh of Rolling Stone said that Protect Sarz at All Costs "makes a case for perfection being unrushed," adding that "each track is rich and sumptuous" and unites its "diverse, elite cast of 17 collaborators" under "Sarz's unique vision." Abioye Samson of Afrocritik stated that the album "radiates effortless joy" on tracks like "Happiness" and praised moments such as "Getting Paid" and "BMF," but concluded that as a full-length project it "rarely surprises or ignites the kind of thrill that makes the listening experience truly unforgettable," rating it 6.9/10.

Patrick Ezema of The Native wrote that Sarz "is not so keen to show off his production virtuoso that he loses sight of his primary goal of a well-curated album," and concluded that the project is "a reminder, for anyone who would dare forget, of Sarz's industry and ingenuity as a music producer," rating it 6.9/10. Adeayo Adebiyi of Pulse Nigeria commended the album's production, writing that "with Sarz, the quality is in the fine lines" and that it "inspires superlative performances from the stars," rating the album 8.5/10. Chibuzo Emmanuel of the Culture Custodian also praised Sarz' production on Protect Sarz at All Costs, praising the blending of styles and chemistry between collaborators, yet adding that the album felt "more like a mixtape than the album it’s promoted as." Temiloluwa Adeyemo of Digimillenials wrote that Protect Sarz at All Costs felt like "both a victory lap and a reminder of [Sarz’s] legacy but also feels like a producer caught between statement and showcase." He concluded that while the album lacked direction, it was "more than a collection of collaborations, [it]'s a reminder of Sarz's unmatched touch and quiet dominance." Michael Kolawole of the Lagos Review stated that the album showed that "the best way to protect Sarz is to allow him room to evolve." He concluded that the album was "a celebration of his influence and a declaration of his untouchable status".

== Track listing ==
All tracks produced by Sarz.

Protect Sarz at All Costs track listing
No.	Title	Writer(s)	Length
1.	"Grateful" (featuring Wurld and Ndlovu Youth Choir)	Osabuohien Osaretin; Sadiq Onifade; Natalie Patterson	2:22
2.	"Happiness" (featuring Asake and Gunna)	Osaretin; Ahmed Ololade; Sergio Kitchens	2:54
3.	"Getting Paid" (featuring Asake, Skillibeng, and Wizkid)	Osaretin; Ololade; Emwah Warmington; Ayodeji Balogun; Tay Iwar	2:28
4.	"Mademoiselle" (featuring Odumodublvck, Shallipopi, Theodora, and Zeina)	Osaretin; Tochukwu Ojogwu; Crown Uzama; Lili-Théodora Mujinga; Zeina Aridi	2:51
5.	"BMF" (featuring Byron Messia and Fireboy DML)	Osaretin; Dylan Byron; Adedamola Adefolahan; Dave Nunes; Anan Ya'ari	2:09
6.	"Body" (featuring Joeboy)	Osaretin; Joseph Akinwale-Donus; Dave Nunes	2:45
7.	"In a Mustang" (featuring Qing Madi)	Osaretin; Chimamanda Chukwuma; Jaydon Lewis	3:15
8.	"Nice n' Slow" (featuring Wurld)	Osaretin; Onifade; Daniel Lee; Nunes; Abasi-Ikpongke Asanga	3:18
9.	"Loved Me Then" (featuring Lojay)	Osaretin; Lekan Onifeso Jr.	2:46
10.	"African Barbie" (featuring Teni and Libianca)	Osaretin; Teniola Apata; Libianca Fonji; Nunes; Lee	3:26
11.	"Up" (featuring Victony)	Osaretin; Anthony Victor; Irewunmi Oluwatimilehin	2:41
12.	"Billions" (featuring Lojay)	Osaretin; Onifeso; Lee	3:44
Total length:			34:44

== Personnel ==
- Osabuohien "Sarz" Osaretin - production, songwriting
- Leandro "Dro" Hidalgo - mixing, mastering

== Charts ==
Chart performance for Protect Sarz at All Costs
Chart (2025)	Peak position
Nigerian Albums (TurnTable)	3
