= 15th Headies Awards =

Nigerian music industry awards

Headies 2022
- Date: 4 September 2022
- Location: Cobb Energy Performing Arts Centre in Atlanta, Georgia
- Hosted by: Anthony Anderson & Osas Ighodaro

Highlights
- Most nominations: Wizkid (10)
- Website: theheadies.com

The Headies 2022 was the 15th edition of Nigerian music awards The Headies. It was held at Cobb Energy Performing Arts Centre in Atlanta, Georgia, United States on 4 September 2022. Hosts were by Anthony Anderson and Osas Ighodaro.

Wizkid lead nominations with ten, Tems and Ayra Starr with eight each. Davido and Adekunle received seven each. The Songwriter of the Year category included in the 2020 edition of The Headies, was renamed to Best Song Writer of the Year, in the 2022 edition.

== Background ==
Nominees were announced on 24 May 2022, ahead of the main event which was held at Cobb Energy Performing Arts Centre in Atlanta, on 2 July 2022.

2022 edition has seven additional categories include; Best Afrobeat Pop Single (Nigeria), Best Afrobeat Pop Album (Nigeria), Best African Collaboration, Best International Collaboration, African Artiste of the Year, International Artist of the Year, and Music Executive of the Year. On 25 June 2022, the executive held the first-ever Headies Brunch, titled "Unveiling The First Ever Global Awards For Afrobeats Music". with music from SPINALL, Major League Djz, Pius Gallery and Pheelz. The private brunch was held in Los Angeles.

== Winners and nominees ==
Below list are nominees and winners. winners are listed first in bold.

Rookie of the Year	Best Recording of the Year
**FAVE**; Babyboy AV; Magixx; Ugoccie	"**Celebrate Me**" – Patoranking; "Essence" – Wizkid ft. Tems and Justin Bieber; "Joy" – Falana; "Loving Is Harder" – Johnny Drille; "Meji Meji" – Brymo; "Somebody's Son" – Tiwa Savage ft. Brandy
Producer of the Year	Songwriter of the Year
**Sarz – "Monalisa" (Lojay & Sarz)**; Beats By Jayy – "Golden" (A-Q); Blaise Beatz – "Sinner" (Adekunle Gold ft. Lucky Daye); Niphkeys – "Feel Good" (MohBad); P.Priime – "Ozumba Mbadiwe" (Reekado Banks); Pheelz – "High" (Adekunle Gold ft. Davido)	**Adekunle Gold – "Sinner"**; Ajebo Hustlers – "Loyalty"; Brymo – "Meji Meji"; Falana – "Joy"; Fireboy DML – "Peru"; Omah Lay – "Understand"
Best R&B Single	Best Rap Single
**"Essence" – Wizkid ft. Tems**; "Baby Riddim" – Fave; "Beggie Beggie" – Ayra Starr ft. CKay; "Running (To You)" – Chike ft. Simi; "Promise" – Niniola; "Sinner" – Adekunle Gold ft. Lucky Daye	**"Feelings" – Ladipoe ft. Bnxn**; "Breathe" – A-Q ft. Chike; "Crown of Clay" – Vector & M.I Abaga ft. Pheelz; "Early Momo" – Vector ft. GoodGirl LA; "Tycoon" – Show Dem Camp ft. Reminisce & Mojo; "Loading" – Olamide ft. Bad Boy Timz
Best Alternative Song	Best Vocal Performance (Female)
**"Doings" – Flavour**; "Free Your Mind" – Made Kuti; "Girlfriend" - Ruger; "Hustle" – Basketmouth, The Cavemen, Bez, Dice Ailes; "Meji Meji' – Brymo; "Selense" – The Cavemen; Nothing Sup’’ - Scato	**Waje – "Last Time"**; Ayra Starr – "Toxic'; Liya – "Alari"; Niniola – "6th Heaven"; Simi – "Running (To You)"; Tems – "Essence"
Best Vocal Performance (Male)	Lyricist on the Roll
**Oxlade – "Ojuju"**; Brymo – "Meji Meji"; Johnny Drille – "Loving Is Harder"; Ric Hassani – "When I'm Gone"; Tay Iwar – "Peaking"	**A-Q – "The Last Cypher"**; Blaqbonez – "The Last Cypher"; Jesse Jagz – "Vipers"; Ladipoe – "Providence"; Payper Corleone – "In Don We Trust"; Vector – "Crown of Clay"
Best Music Video	Best Collaboration
**TG Omori – "Champion" (Fireboy DML ft. D Smoke)**; Meji Alabi — "Ginger" (Wizkid ft. Burna Boy); Pink — "Roju" (Chike); Ovie Etseyatse — "Rain" (Yemi Alade ft. Mzansi Youth Choir); TG Omori — "Bling" (Blaqbonez ft. Amaarae & Bnxn); Director K — "Running" (Ladipoe ft. Fireboy DML)	**"Essence" – Wizkid ft. Tems**; "Beggie Beggie" – Ayra Starr ft. CKay; "Bling" – Blaqbonez ft. Amaarae & Bnxn; "Early Momo" – Vector ft. GoodGirl LA; "Feeling" – Ladipoe ft. Bnxn; "Running (To You)" – Chike ft. Simi
Best Street-Hop Artiste	Best Afrobeats Single of the Year
**Nektunez & Goya Menor – "Ameno Amapiano"**; Bella Shmurda – "Cash App" ft. Zlatan & Lincoln; Rexxie & Mohbad – "KPK"; MohBad – "Feel Good"; Naira Marley – "Koleyewon"	**"Peru" – Fireboy DML**; "Bloody Samaritan" – Ayra Starr; "Bounce" – Ruger; "High" – Adekunle Gold ft. Davido; "Monalisa" – Lojay & Sarz; "Ozumba Mbadiwe" – Reekado Banks
Headies' Viewer's Choice	Best West African Artist of the Year
**Ayra Starr – "Bloody Samaritan"**; Fireboy DML – "Peru"; Joeboy – "Sip (Alcohol)"; Lojay & Sarz – "Monalisa"; Nektunez & Goya Menor – "Ameno Amapiano"; Olamide ft. Omah Lay – "Infinity"; Rema – "Soundgasm"; Wizkid ft. Tems – "Essence"	**Gyakie (Ghana)**; Amaarae (Ghana); Angélique Kidjo (Benin); Aya Nakamura (Mali); KiDi (Ghana); Nelson Freitas (Cape Verde)
Best East African Artist of the Year	Best North African Artist of the Year
**Diamond Platnumz (Tanzania)**; Eddy Kenzo (Uganda); Harmonize (Tanzania); Meddy (Rwanda); Nikita Kering (Kenya); Zuchu (Tanzania); Sauti Sol (Kenya)	**Latifa (Tunisia)**; Emel Mathlouthi (Tunisia); ElGrandeToto (Morocco); Manal (Morocco); Mohamed Ramadan (Egypt); Soolking (Algeria)
Best Southern African Artist of the Year	Best Central African Artist of the Year
**Focalistic (South Africa)**; Black Coffee (South Africa); DJ Tarico (Mozambique); Elaine (South Africa); Jah Prayzah (Zimbabwe); Sha Sha (Zimbabwe); Nasty C (South Africa)	**Innoss'B (Democratic Republic of the Congo)**; Calema (São Tomé and Príncipe); Blanche Bailly (Cameroon); Dadju (Democratic Republic of the Congo); Fally Ipupa (Democratic Republic of the Congo); Soraia Ramos (Cape Verde)
Best Afrobeats Album	Best Reggae/Dancehall Album
**Made In Lagos: Deluxe Edition – Wizkid**; 19 & Dangerous – Ayra Starr; A Better Time – Davido; Barnabas – Kizz Daniel; Kpos Lifestyle – Ajebo Hustlers; Wondaland – Teni	**Three – Patoranking**; Gratitude – Timaya; Love is War – Prettyboy D-O; Rainbow Riddim – Shank; Yaadman Kingsize – Yung L
Best R&B Album	Best Alternative Album
**If Orange Was A Place – Tems**; Before We Fall Asleep – Johnny Drille; Love Deep High Life – Omawumi; Rising – Falana; The Prince I Became – Ric Hassani; Water & Garri – Tiwa Savage	**Intermission – Ibejii**; 9: Èsan – Brymo; Legacy+ – Femi Kuti & Made Kuti; Love And Highlife – The Cavemen; P.S. Thank You For Waiting – Wavy the Creator; Yabasi – Basketmouth
Best Rap Album	Album of the Year
**Carpe Diem – Olamide**; Clone Wars Vol. 5 – The Algorhythm – Show Dem Camp; Golden – A-Q; Mafia Culture, Vol. 2.0 – Idowest; Providence – Ladipoe; Sex Over Love – Blaqbonez	**Made In Lagos (Deluxe Edition) – Wizkid**; 9: Èsan – Brymo; 19 & Dangerous – Ayra Starr; Carpe Diem – Olamide; Legacy+ – Femi Kuti & Made Kuti; Yabasi – Basketmouth
Song of the Year	Best Female Artist
**"Essence" – Wizkid ft. Tems**; "Celebrate Me" – Patoranking; "Doings" – Flavour ft. Phyno; "High" – Adekunle Gold ft. Davido; "Monalisa" – Lojay & Sarz; "Peru" – Fireboy DML	**Tems**; Simi; Tiwa Savage; Teni; Niniola
Best Male Artist	Next Rated
**Burna Boy**; Adekunle Gold; Davido; Flavour; Olamide; Wizkid; Lord Bliss	**BNXN**; Ayra Starr; Lojay; Ruger; Zinoleesky
African Artist of the Year	International Artiste Recognition
**Burna Boy** (Nigeria); Black Coffee (South Africa); Davido (Nigeria); Diamond Platnumz (Tanzania); Soolking (Algeria); Wizkid (Nigeria); Aya Nakamura (Mali) (France)	**Chris Brown**
Special Recognition	Hall of Fame
Bose Ogulu; Sunday Are; Efe Omorogbe	Angélique Kidjo
Humanitarian Award of the Year	International Artiste Special Recognition
**Davido**; 2Baba; Ruggedman; Lord Bliss; Don Jazzy; Mr. P	Wyclef Jean; Akon
