= Zeina (singer) =

Canadian pop singer (born 1996)

Zeina Aridi (born March 12, 1996 in Brooklyn), known mononymously as Zeina, is a Canadian pop singer from Montreal, Quebec, who released her debut album Eastend Confessions in 2024.

Born in Brooklyn to an Egyptian father and a Lebanese mother, she incorporates pop, rhythm, blues and Arabic music influences into her style, and sings in English, French and Arabic. "Hooked", her first single to chart in the Canadian Hot 100, is a gender-flipped response to Shawn Desman's 2002 single "Shook".

She received two Juno Award nominations at the Juno Awards of 2025, for Breakthrough Artist or Group of the Year and Contemporary R&B/Soul Recording of the Year for Eastend Confessions.

== Discography ==
=== Studio albums ===
List of studio albums, showing release date, label and formats
Title	Details
Eastend Confessions	Released: April 3, 2024; Label: Independent; Formats: Digital download, streaming

=== Extended plays ===
List of EPs, showing release date, label and formats
Title	Details
Odd One Out	Released: November 17, 2021; Label: Independent; Formats: Digital download, streaming

=== Singles ===
==== As lead artist ====
List of singles as lead artist, with selected chart positions, showing year released and album name
Title	Year	Peak chart positions			Album/EP
Title	Year	CAN	GRE Air.	TUR Int. Air.	Album/EP
"Washing Machine"	2016	—	—	—	Non-album singles
"Trap Ballad"	2016	—	—	—	Non-album singles
"Fallin"	2017	—	—	—	Odd One Out
"Tear Drops"	2018	—	—	—	Non-album singles
"In My Head"	2019	—	—	—	Non-album singles
"Killer"	2019	—	—	—	Non-album singles
"Awake"	2019	—	—	—	Non-album singles
"Suburbs"	2020	—	—	—	Non-album singles
"Consequences"	2020	—	—	—	Non-album singles
"Can't Trust U"	2020	—	—	—	Non-album singles
"Teach"	2021	—	—	—	Non-album singles
"Talk Love"	2021	—	—	—	Non-album singles
"Give Me Time"	2022	—	—	—	Eastend Confessions
"Risk It All"	2022	—	—	—	Non-album singles
"Ur Loss"	2022	—	—	—	Non-album singles
"Whatever"	2023	—	—	—	Eastend Confessions
"Nasty"	2023	—	—	—	Eastend Confessions
"Take Me Down"	2023	—	—	—	Eastend Confessions
"Hooked"	2024	77	—	—	Eastend Confessions
"Problematic"	2024	—	—	—	Eastend Confessions
"Allo Min" (with Oualid)	2024	—	—	—	Non-album singles
"SOS"	2024	—	—	—	Non-album singles
"No More Streetivities"	2024	—	—	—	Non-album singles
"Denim"	2025	—	—	—	Non-album singles
"Times Two"	2025	—	—	—	Non-album singles
"Jananto"	2025	—	7	7	Non-album singles
"So What"	2025	—	—	—	Non-album singles
"Difficile"	2025	—	—	—	Non-album singles
"Call Me Baby"	2025	—	—	—	Non-album singles
"Dalou3a (Nari)"	2026	—	—	—	Non-album singles
"—" denotes a recording that did not chart or was not released in that territory.

==== As featured artist ====
List of singles as featured artist, showing year released and album name
Title	Year	Album/EP
"Feel So" (NYX Professional Makeup featuring Zeina)	2025	Non-album single
"Mademoiselle" (Sarz feat. Odumodublvck, Shallipopi, Theodora, Zeina)	2025	Protect Sarz At All Costs

=== Guest appearances ===
List of guest appearances, with other artists, showing year released and album name
Title	Year	Other artist(s)	Album/EP
"SYBP"	2023	MadeinTYO, Ninety6Miles	NEO TYO
