= 19 & Dangerous =

Studio album by Ayra Starr
- Released: 6 August 2021; 21 October 2022 (Deluxe)
- Recorded: 2020–2021
- Studio: Mavin Studios
- Genres: Afropop; R&B; trap; alté
- Length: 33:14
- Label: Mavin
- Producers: Louddaaa; London; Don Jazzy; Andre Vibez

Ayra Starr chronology
Ayra Starr (2021)	19 & Dangerous (2021)	The Year I Turned 21 (2024)

Singles from 19 & Dangerous
- 1. "Bloody Samaritan" Released: July 30, 2021

19 & Dangerous is the debut studio album by Nigerian singer-songwriter Ayra Starr. It was released on 6 August 2021 by Mavin Records and Platoon, less than seven months after the singer's self-titled debut EP. 19 & Dangerous was a concept album following a Gen Z girl transitioning from adolescence into early adulthood with growing confidence, artistic zeal, sentimentality and empathy. Ayra Starr worked with producers London, Andre Vibez, Louddaaa and Don Jazzy, the latter two of whom also contributed production to her previous record. In addition to reuniting with her preexisting musical partners, she also collaborated with several new writers and artists including Fousheé and CKay.

19 & Dangerous is primarily an afropop, R&B, trap and alté album that incorporates influences from genres like neo-soul, jazz, and EDM. Lyrically, it revolves around topics associated with love, such as unrequited love, romantic breakup distress, betrayal and heartbreak as well as more personal themes such as self-determination and self-esteem. The album received generally favorable response from both fans and music critics. Its lead single, "Bloody Samaritan", peaked atop Nigeria's TurnTable Top 50, making Ayra Starr the first female artist in the history of the chart to reach number-one with a solo song. Within it first two months of release the album had amassed over 30 million streams on all platforms.

== Background ==
In 2020, Ayra Starr signed a record deal with Mavin Records, and began recording material for her debut project. The following year, she released her eponymous debut EP which became a commercial success and would pave the way for her next project.

During the week of 11 July 2021, she announced plans to release her debut studio album. On 19 July, she posted the teaser trailer for the new album on social media, revealing the title as 19 & Dangerous and its release date to be 6 August. Ayra Starr explained how the album got its title in an interview with NotJustOk, she said: "I didn't want it to be 20 & Dangerous, I wanted 19 & Dangerous and always knew for the past two years. I knew even before Mavin that for my first album, I wanted to release it at 19 and have it titled 19 & Dangerous." She also stated that she chose the word "Dangerous" to express how career-ready and goal-oriented she is.

The lead single from 19 & Dangerous, "Bloody Samaritan", was officially released on 30 July 2021, two days after its premiere on BBC Radio 1Xtra. On 4 August 2021, Ayra Starr unveiled the album's cover art and tracklist alongside its pre-order. On 6 August, shortly after the album's release, the title of the sixth track was changed from "Underwater" to "In Between" on physical and digital stores worldwide. Ayra Starr told Vincent Desmond of OkayAfrica that the album is a "message", adding "I want people to know that I am not scared, I'm prepared, I'm ready for this. I've been preparing for this my whole life. The Ayra Starr EP, my first project, was more like an introduction to Ayra, it was a prologue. This album is chapter one."

== Composition ==
In its introduction "Cast (Gen Z Anthem)", an anthem of defiance. 'If I cast, make I cast' she sings in Nigerian pidgin. Oris Aigbokhaevbolo of Music In Africa said the song could be read as a warning of an intro track: If the album cast, make e cast, I have done my bit. Luckily, the album no cast. In "Fashion killer", she flaunts feminine poise and black girl magic, says Israel Olorunnisola of Pulse Nigeria. In "Lonely", we see that Ayra Star is very human. After succumbing to the tricky nature of infatuations, the burning emotions young love comes with, the vulnerability and innocence that it explores along the slippery slope of heartbreak.

In "Toxic", the experimentation with drugs to navigate depression, anxiety, peer pressure, heartbreak, and many emotions teenagers are dealing with is narrated in a thought-provoking tone. Quoting J. Cole from FRIENDS 'Meditate don't Medicate'. The Alté track "Beggie Beggie" features vocals from CKay, with his sonorous delivery on the 90s themed tune. As they both go on and off over the thrill of young love in today's modern world, In "Bridgertn", Ayra flaunts some class. and ends the 33 minutes LP record with best wishes upon herself and listeners in album outro "Amin".

== Singles and other releases ==
"Bloody Samaritan" was released as the album's lead single on July 30, 2021.

== Critical reception ==
Professional ratings
Review scores
Source	Rating
NME	4/5 stars
Pulse Nigeria	7.9/10

19 & Dangerous received generally favorable reviews from music critics. In a review for New Musical Express, Sophie Williams characterized the album as "a collection of uber-confident, and sensational afropop gems". A writer for Pulse Nigeria, described the album "In a way, '19 and Dangerous' is like the love-child of Adele's '19' and Rihanna's Good Girl Gone Bad, underpinned by the fiery, alluringly vain, carefree, consequences-be-damned Gen Z tendencies of 'Cast,' the album opener - or manifesto. Interestingly, Rihanna was 19 when that album was released and Ayra Starr is a card-carrying member of Rihanna's navy". Rating the album 7.9/10.

Reviewing for Music in Africa, music journalist Oris Aigbokhaevbolo praised Ayra in her word "19 & Dangerous is an impressive collection of songs", and despite it comparison with her breakthrough single Away, Oris says "At 33 minutes and 11 songs, 19 & Dangerous is a different beast from the 4-song EP. It is more expansive and provides Ayra Starr with an opportunity to do more". This Day's Iyke Bede commended the album's production, composition and subject matter, calling it an "impressive debut". He further described the album as a "well-told story" that "the average Gen Z (or anyone at that) would describe using the words, "issa bop for me".

=== Year-end lists ===
Select year-end rankings of Platinumb Heart
Critic/Publication	List	Rank	Ref.
Pan-African Music	The 50 best albums of 2021	22	

== Track listing ==
No.	Title	Writer(s)	Producer(s)	Length
1.	"Cast (Gen Z Anthem)"	Oyinkansola Sarah Aderibigbe	Louddaaa	2:45
2.	"Fashion Killer"	Aderibigbe	London	2:57
3.	"Lonely"	Aderibigbe	Louddaaa	3:08
4.	"Snitch" (featuring Fousheé)	Aderibigbe; Britanny Fousheé	London	3:17
5.	"Toxic"	Aderibigbe	Don Jazzy	2:37
6.	"In Between"	Aderibigbe	Louddaaa	3:16
7.	"Beggie Beggie" (featuring CKay)	Aderibigbe; Chukwuka Ekweani	Louddaaa	3:29
8.	"Karma"	Aderibigbe	Don Jazzy	2:48
9.	"Bloody Samaritan"	Aderibigbe	Don Jazzy	3:07
10.	"Bridgertn"	Aderibigbe	Andre Vibez	3:22
11.	"Amin"	Aderibigbe	Louddaaa	2:28
Total length:				33:14

== Deluxe track listing ==
No.	Title	Writer(s)	Producer(s)	Length
1.	"Cast (Gen Z Anthem)"	Aderibigbe	Louddaaa	2:45
2.	"Fashion Killer"	Aderibigbe	London	2:57
3.	"Ase"	Aderibigbe		2:46
4.	"Bloody Samaritan" (Remix featuring Kelly Rowland)	Aderibigbe	London	3:09
5.	"Lonely Refix" (featuring Zinoleesky)	Aderibigbe	Louddaaa; Niphkeys	2:43
6.	"Snitch" (featuring Fousheé)	Aderibigbe; Britanny Fousheé	London	3:17
7.	"Toxic"	Aderibigbe	Don Jazzy	2:37
8.	"In Between"	Aderibigbe	Louddaaa	3:16
9.	"Running" (featuring Lojay)	Aderibigbe	Louddaa; Johnny Drille	2:22
10.	"Beggie Beggie" (featuring CKay)	Aderibigbe; Chukwuka Ekweani	Louddaaa	3:29
11.	"Karma"	Aderibigbe	Jazzy	2:48
12.	"Bridgertn"	Aderibigbe	Andre Vibez	3:22
13.	"Rush"	Aderibigbe	Vibez; Henry Velasco	3:05
14.	"Skinny Girl Anthem" (featuring Kayykilo)	Aderibigbe	Vibez; Velasco	3:08
15.	"Bloody Samaritan"	Aderibigbe	Jazzy	3:07
16.	"Amin"	Aderibigbe	Louddaaa	2:28
Total length:				47:20

== Personnel ==
- Oyinkansola Sarah Aderibigbe – vocals, songwriting
- Louddaaa – executive producer, production (tracks 1, 3, 6, 7, 11)
- Don Jazzy – production (tracks 5, 8)
- London – production (tracks 2, 4, 9)
- Andre Vibez – production (tracks 10)
- Johnny Drille – mixing, mastering (all tracks)
- Richie Igunma – graphic design

== Charts ==
Chart performance for 19 & Dangerous
Chart (2022)	Peak position
Nigerian Albums (TurnTable)	7

== Release history ==
Release history and formats for 19 & Dangerous
Region	Date	Format	Version	Label
Various	6 August 2021	CD, digital download	Standard	Mavin
