= Lost and Found (Simi album) =

2024 studio album by Simi

Studio album by Simi
- Released: 5 July 2024
- Recorded: 2022–2024
- Genres: Afrobeats; R&B; soul
- Length: 38:43
- Label: Studio Brat
- Producers: Louddaaa; Simi; Vtek; BIGFISH; Funwon

Simi chronology
TBH (To Be Honest) (2022)	Lost and Found (2024)

Singles from Lost and Found
- 1. "All I Want" Released: 23 February 2024; 2. "Men Are Crazy" Released: 5 April 2024; 3. "Borrow Me Your Baby" Released: 31 May 2024

Lost and Found is the fifth studio album by Nigerian singer Simi. It was released on 5 July 2024, by her independent record label Studio Brat. The album features guest appearances from Tiwa Savage, Lojay, Bella Shmurda, Aṣa, Falz, Ladipoe and Ebenezer Obey. Its production was mainly handled by Louddaaa, along with additional production from Vtek, Bigfish, Funwon and Simi herself. Lost and Found received generally positive reviews from music critics, who praised Simi's vocals and nostalgic sound. It serves as the follow-up to her previous album, To Be Honest (2022).

== Background and promotion ==
Simi first hinted at the album during an appearance on the podcast Tea With Tay with podcaster Taymesan, where she said it would be released later in 2024. In an interview with Chinonso Ihekire of The Guardian, Simi said she had worked on the album for about two years. She explained that the title, Lost and Found, reflects a period after the birth of her daughter when music "became just about work", adding that while making the project she "started to connect to that childlike passion again". On 18 June 2024, she announced the album's title, while on 20 June she shared the tracklist and cover art alongside a promotional trailer.

== Singles ==
The album was preceded by three singles. The lead single, "All I Want", was released on 23 February 2024 and produced by Louddaaa. Its music video, directed by 1 Of My Guys, premiered on 29 February 2024. The Tiwa Savage-assisted second single, "Men Are Crazy", was produced by Bigfish and released on 5 April 2024. Its music video was directed by Director Pink. The third single, "Borrow Me Your Baby", featuring Falz, was produced by Vtek with additional production from Simi and released on 31 May 2024. The music video, directed by Perlinks, was released on 22 June 2024.

== Critical reception ==
Professional ratings
Review scores
Source	Rating
Afrocritik	6.3/10
Pulse Nigeria	7.4/10

Pulse Nigeria's Adeayo Adebiyi described the album as a nostalgic return to the style of Simi's earlier work, comparing it to her second studio album Simisola. He wrote that the record "connects through songs that offer the rush of nostalgia that endeared listeners to Simi's music" while also showing "flashes of artistic evolution", adding that although it lacks songs likely to match her earlier commercial successes, it "reflect[s] her current position in her career". He gave the album a rating of 7.4 out of 10.

Tomide Marv of Zikoko called the album "a dizzying package of unfiltered love confessions and unapologetic romanticism", adding that Simi revisits the nostalgia of earlier projects and "finds comfort in her strength again, then makes another good album out of her rediscovery". Abioye Damilare Samson of Afrocritik characterized Lost and Found as a "confident assemblage of tracks distinguished by Simi's sonorous vocals", adding that it revisits "the music that propelled her into prominence" while reaffirming her position as "a connoisseur of modern African ballads". Samson gave it a rating of 6.3 out of 10. Aaron Ashuman of Doth Music wrote that the album has "some inconsistency in the middle" despite Simi's "magical vocals" remaining a highlight, concluding that while it may not be her best work it still offers "a good overall listening experience".

== Track listing ==
Lost and Found track listing
No.	Title	Writer(s)	Producer(s)	Length
1.	"Lost and Found"	Simisola Ogunleye	Simi	2:56
2.	"Miracle Worker" (featuring Lojay)	Ogunleye; Lekan Osifeso Jr.; Kehinde Alabi	Louddaaa	3:05
3.	"Gimme Something"	Ogunleye; Alabi	Louddaaa	2:15
4.	"Know You II" (featuring Ladipoe)	Ogunleye; Ladipo Eso	Louddaaa	2:58
5.	"Alafia" (featuring Bella Shmurda)	Ogunleye; Akinbiyi Abiola Ahmed; Adekunle Kosoko; Alabi	Louddaaa	3:06
6.	"Messiah" (featuring Aṣa)	Ogunleye; Bukola Elemide; Alabi	Louddaaa	3:00
7.	"All I Want"	Ogunleye; Alabi	Louddaaa	2:55
8.	"One of One"	Ogunleye; Alabi	Louddaaa	2:28
9.	"Romance Therapy"	Ogunleye; Alabi	Louddaaa	2:00
10.	"Borrow Me Your Baby" (featuring Falz)	Ogunleye; Folarin Falana	Vtek; Simi	3:08
11.	"Men Are Crazy" (featuring Tiwa Savage)	Ogunleye; Tiwatope Savage; Prince Oghenemine Omoferi; Abayomi Ilerioluwa	BIGFISH	3:06
12.	"RnB Luv"	Ogunleye; Ilerioluwa	BIGFISH	2:39
13.	"Woman to Woman"	Ogunleye; Alabi	Louddaaa	2:07
14.	"Jowo" (featuring Chief Commander Ebenezer Obey)	Ogunleye; Ebenezer Obey-Fabiyi; Samuel Idowu	Funwon	2:56
Total length:				38:43

== Personnel ==
- Simisola Ogunleye – vocals, production, mixing
- Tiwatope Savage – vocals
- Lekan Osifeso Jr. – vocals
- Chief Commander Ebenezer Obey-Fabiyi – vocals
- Ladipo Eso – vocals
- Folarin Falana – vocals
- Akinbiyi Abiola Ahmed – vocals
- Bukola Elemide – vocals
- Samuel Idowu – production
- Kehinde Alabi – production
- Abayomi Ilerioluwa – production
- Victor Kpoudosu – production
