= The Bushwick Hotel =

US musical group

The Bushwick Hotel is an American musical group.

== History ==
Lead singer and guitarist Gregory Ferreira was born and raised in Boston and started playing the guitar professionally at age nine. As a seasoned producer and audio engineer, Gregory moved to Brooklyn in 2006 and started Live by the Sword Studio. While living in Brooklyn, Gregory recorded his first solo album; The Suitcase Album; played with Missing Ships, and has since worked on a variety of jazz and hip hop projects alongside other musicians.

Gregory met Matt Lon Vor, Erik Naslund, Rudy Temp, and Ben Teters and collaborated with them to start a band. Matt played the soprano saxophone and clarinet, Erik played bass guitar while Rudy played slide guitar and all three worked in unison to provide background vocals. The release of the video for Graffiti of the Young Man's Mind, the title track from their debut album, sought to capture the themes associated with the mind of an adolescent experiencing detachment from their environment, drugs and escapism.

Director and fashion photographer Catherine Westergaard and Dale Krupla produced the film within two weeks while collaborating with the band for New York fashion Week to do an event called Fashionably Late. Catherine would later do an interview with Royal Young chronicling her experiences with the C24 gallery opening, for which she debuted the Graffiti of the Young Man's Mind video.

As an up-and-coming local band, the artists sought to build a name for themselves. They and largely found their calling in street art. Gregory and Rudy would sell city maps and paintings along Bedford Ave in Williamsburg.

The band also invested in their brand by opening an alternative mall called the Rock n’ Shop. The mall offered free live performances for all ages, free food and drinks, arts and crafts, tattoos and haircuts.

In 2017, The Bushwick Hotel released their single, Show You the Way. Thereafter, they released their EP, Hard Times. The band played their record with 6-time Grammy Award winner Joey Williams of the Blind Boys of Alabama and Robert Randolph. Dale Krupla directed the video for Kristina, one of the records from the EP, shot in Phoenix and Brooklyn by Scott Irvine and Kim Menelt. Consequently, they landed the 4th spot on Billboard's Next Big Sound Chart.
