= Ayra Starr (EP) =

2021 EP by Ayra Starr

EP by Ayra Starr
- Released: 22 January 2021
- Recorded: Mavin Studios, (Lagos, Nigeria)
- Genres: R&B; neo soul; afropop
- Length: 13:26
- Label: Mavin

Ayra Starr chronology
Ayra Starr (2021)	19 & Dangerous (2021)

Ayra Starr is the debut extended play by Nigerian singer-songwriter Ayra Starr. It was released on 22 January 2021 through Mavin Records.

After covering several songs by popular artists on Instagram, Ayra Starr posted her first original song on her page in December 2019. This brought her to the attention of record executive Don Jazzy. She signed her first recording contract with Mavin Records, Jazzy's record label and began working on the EP in January 2020. Ayra Starr collaborated with producers Louddaaa, Dayogrey and Don Jazzy, on the record, and co-wrote four of its songs with her brother. Musically, the EP combines elements of R&B and neo-soul with Afropop percussive rhythms. Lyrically, it touches on themes relating to teenage angst, romance and coming-of-age experiences.

Ayra Starr received generally favorable reviews from critics. It reached number 1 on Nigeria iTunes and peaked atop the Apple Music charts of countries including Nigeria, Ghana, Uganda, Sierra Leone and Gambia. It spawned the hit song "Away," which charted at 4 on the TurnTable Top 50.

== Background and release ==
Ayra Starr began posting cover recordings of songs by artists like Andra Day and 2Baba online in 2019. Though she had a strong following at the time, her career did not officially start until she posted her first original work on Instagram. The song quickly received thousands of views on the social networking platform and caught the attention of record executive and producer Don Jazzy who signed her to Mavin Records.

Ayra Starr drew inspiration from artists like Lijadu Sisters, 2Baba, and Wande Coal. In January 2020, she began working on a debut project at Mavin Studios with producers Louddaaa, Dayogrey and Don Jazzy. She revealed in an interview that her intention with the album was to make music that would resonate with both young and old listeners. Ikon, Louddaaa and Johnny Drille handled the mixing and mastering process. Of the five songs on the EP, Ayra Starr wrote one and co-wrote the remaining four with her brother Dami.

On 22 January 2021, the EP, along with the music video for its first track "Away" was released to digital music streaming services.

I set out to create an honest, engaging body of work that reflected my journey so far and I believe that’s what I’ve done.

— Ayra Starr on the EP.

== Music and lyrics ==
Ayra Starr is a five-track set containing a mixture of introspective and emotional lyrics, exploring themes of romance, infatuations, heartbreaks and empowerment from the teen viewpoint. It primarily features elements of R&B with neo-soul, and incorporates Afropop percussive rhythms. Commenting on the EP's sound, Ayra Starr said:

I was very intentional on making different sounds. I didn’t want anything to sound the same. I didn’t want it to sound like a specific thing, I want people to take different things from different sounds. I was very intentional with what I wrote, with every word I used I tried to make it relatable and use things that people would relate to the most.

The EP begins with "Away", an R&B-styled song in which Ayra Starr sends a message to an ex-lover to refrain from attempting to rekindle their love affair. The second track, "Ija" is an uptempo Afropop–neosoul tune backed by lush keyboard chords. The title translates as "Fight" in English. Lyrically, "Ija" is about owning one's sexuality. The influence of trap can be heard on "DITR," which discusses "the coming-of-age of the modern-day teenager—experimenting with drugs, peer pressure, and all the experiences that teenagers face." The fourth song on the EP "Sare," meaning "Run", is an Afropop track that contains a sample from the 1979 song "Orere Elejigbo" by Lijadu Sisters. The lyrics express romantic love, as the singer tells her lover "I want your love so don't run away." The EP closes with a mid-tempo, romantic piece called "Memories." Ayra Starr is found "craving for longer moments, as she assures her love interest of sustained presence."

== Reception and commercial performance ==
Professional ratings
Review scores
Source	Rating
Pulse Nigeria	8/10

Ayra Starr was met with generally favorable reviews from critics. Motolani Alake of the Pulse Nigeria described the EP as "a topsy-turvy chronicle of love or love-themed situations." Alake noted that the EP also "feels like Wizkid-esque mid-tempo experimental Afro-pop." In a review for TooXclusive, Chiamaka Fidelis praised Ayra Starr for her "beautiful voice" and "exceptional songwriting skills." Timi Sotire, writing for NME, complimented Ayra Starr's lyricism on the album and called it "a collection of her raw, unfiltered thoughts". NativeMag's Tami Makinde concluded that the "vulnerability in her music creates something that sonically feels like a late-night conversation with your homegirls – familiar and new all at the same time."

The EP reached number 1 on Nigeria iTunes and peaked atop the Apple Music charts of countries including Nigeria, Ghana, Uganda, Sierra Leone, Gambia and had accumulated over 11 million streams by March 2021. It spawned the hit song "Away," which charted at 4 on the TurnTable Top 50.

== Track listing ==
Ayra Starr track listing
No.	Title	Writer(s)	Producer(s)	Length
1.	"Away"	Oluwadamilare Aderibigbe; Oyinkansola Sarah Aderibigbe	Louddaaa	2:49
2.	"Ija"	Oluwadamilare Aderibigbe; Oyinkansola Sarah Aderibigbe	Dayogrey	3:14
3.	"DITR"	Oluwadamilare Aderibigbe; Oyinkansola Sarah Aderibigbe	Louddaaa	2:12
4.	"Sare"	Oluwadamilare Aderibigbe; Oyinkansola Sarah Aderibigbe	Don Jazzy	2:34
5.	"Memories"	Oyinkansola Sarah Aderibigbe	Louddaaa	2:35
Total length:				13:26

Sample credits

- "Sare" samples "Orere Elejigbo" by Lijadu Sisters.
