= The Headies Award for African Artiste of the Year =

Annual Nigerian music industry award

- Awarded for: An individual African artiste or group with the most outstanding achievement, impact and infiltration into the international music scene within the year under review.
- Country: Nigeria
- Presented by: Hip Hop World Magazine
- First award: 2006
- Final award: 2023
- Currently held by: Rema (2023)
- Website: theheadies.com

The Headies Award for African Artiste of the Year is an award presented at The Headies, a ceremony that was established in 2006 and originally called the Hip Hop World Awards. (Note: The nominees for this edition are not included in the Recipients table because they are not available.) It was first awarded to Ghanaian hip-hop group V.I.P in 2006.

== Recipients ==
Year	Nominees	Result	Ref
2006	(Ghana) V.I.P	Won	
2007	(Ghana) V.I.P	Won	
2008	(Ghana) Batman Samini	Won	
2008	(South Africa) Freshlyground	Nominated	
2008	(Kenya) Nameless	Nominated	
2008	(South Africa) HHP	Nominated	
2008	(South Africa) Jozi	Nominated	
2009	(Zimbabwe) Buffalo	Nominated	(Note: The winner for this edition is not included in the Recipients table because it is not available.)
2009	(Ghana) Tinny	Nominated	(Note: The winner for this edition is not included in the Recipients table because it is not available.)
2009	(Namibia) The Dogg	Nominated	(Note: The winner for this edition is not included in the Recipients table because it is not available.)
2009	(Tanzania) Witness	Nominated	(Note: The winner for this edition is not included in the Recipients table because it is not available.)
2011	(Angola) Cabo Snoop	Won	
2011	(Ghana) R2Bees	Nominated	
2011	(South Africa) Liquideep	Nominated	
2011	(South Africa) Freshlyground	Nominated	
2011	(Ghana) V.I.P	Nominated	
2012	(Ghana) Sarkodie	Won	
2012	(Kenya) Camp Mulla	Nominated	
2012	(Ghana) D-Black	Nominated	
2012	(South Africa) Zahara	Nominated	
2014	(Ghana) Sarkodie	Won	
2014	(South Africa) Mafikizolo	Nominated	
2014	(Tanzania) Diamond Platnumz	Nominated	
2014	(Ghana) R2Bees	Nominated	
2015	(Ghana) Sarkodie	Won	
2015	(Tanzania) Diamond Platnumz	Nominated	
2015	(South Africa) Cassper Nyovest	Nominated	
2015	(South Africa) Uhuru	Nominated	
2015	(South Africa) AKA	Nominated	
2016	(Kenya) Sauti Sol	Nominated	
2016	(South Africa) Cassper Nyovest	Nominated	
2016	(South Africa) DJ Maphorisa	Nominated	
2016	(Ghana) Stonebwoy	Nominated	
2016	(Ghana) Sarkodie	Nominated	
2018	(South Africa) Nasty C	Won	
2018	(South Africa) Cassper Nyovest	Nominated	
2018	(Kenya) Sauti Sol	Nominated	
2018	(Tanzania) Vanessa Mdee	Nominated	
2019	(Ghana) King Promise	Won	
2019	(South Africa) Master KG	Nominated	
2019	(Ivory Coast) Afro B	Nominated	
2019	(Kenya) Sauti Sol	Nominated	
2019	(South Africa) DJ Maphorisa	Nominated	
2020	(South Africa) Master KG	Won	
2020	(Ghana) Kuami Eugene	Nominated	
2020	(Kenya) Sauti Sol	Nominated	
2020	(Ghana) Shatta Wale	Nominated	
2020	(Ghana) Stonebwoy	Nominated	
2022	(Nigeria) Burna Boy	Won	
2022	(South Africa) Black Coffee	Nominated	
2022	(Nigeria) Davido	Nominated	
2022	(Tanzania) Diamond Platnumz	Nominated	
2022	(Algeria) Soolking	Nominated	
2022	(Nigeria) Wizkid	Nominated	
2022	(Mali) / (France) Aya Nakamura	Nominated	
2023	(Nigeria) Rema	Won	
2023	(Nigeria) Burna Boy	Nominated	
2023	(Morocco) Marwa Loud	Nominated	
2023	(Ghana) Black Sherif	Nominated	
2023	(Tanzania) Diamond Platnumz	Nominated	

== Category records ==
Most wins

Rank	1st	2nd	3rd
Artist	Sarkodie	V.I.P	Rema; Burna Boy; Master KG; King Promise; Nasty C Cabo Snoop; Samini
Total wins	3 wins	2 wins	1 win

Most nominations

Rank	1st	2nd	3rd
Artist	Diamond Platnumz	Sauti Sol	Cassper Nyovest; Stonebwoy; Freshlyground; DJ Maphorisa; R2Bees
Total noms	5 nominations	4 nominations	3 nominations
