= Louddaaa =

Nigerian record producer

- Born: Kehinde Alabi; Lagos, Lagos State, Nigeria
- Genres: Afrobeats; Afropop
- Occupations: record producer; disc jockey; songwriter
- Years active: 2021–present

Kehinde Alabi, known professionally as Louddaaa, is a Nigerian record producer, songwriter, and sound engineer. He is best known for his production work on Ayra Starr's breakout single "Away", featured on her self-titled debut EP.

Louddaaa has worked with several prominent Nigerian artists, producing tracks such as "Last Heartbreak Song" and "Orun" by Ayra Starr, "All I Want" by Simi, "Maria" by Magixx, and "Anything" and "10 Kilo" by Davido. He won the Afro Soul Producer of the Year at the 2023 Beatz Awards. In 2025, he was named among the "Hottest African Producers Right Now" by OkayAfrica.

== Early life ==
Louddaaa was born in Lagos, Nigeria, and is originally from Ekiti State. During his university education, he was introduced to music production software by a roommate. His interest in music production deepened during his National Youth Service Corps (NYSC) year, when he began to focus more seriously on sound engineering.

== Career ==
Louddaaa joined Mavin Records as a sound engineer after a series of unsuccessful attempts to enter the industry. While primarily responsible for engineering recording sessions, he began producing instrumentals during off-hours. One of his beats was selected by Mavin CEO Don Jazzy, who encouraged Ayra Starr to record over it. The track became "Away", which served as Starr's breakthrough single. Following the success of "Away", Louddaaa contributed to Ayra Starr's subsequent albums, including 19 & Dangerous and The Year I Turned 21. He has since expanded his collaborations across the Nigerian music industry, working with artists such as: Black Sherif, Tion Wayne, and ArrDee.

== Production discography ==
=== Albums produced ===
Artist	Album	Release date	Certifications	Label	Note
Ayra Starr	Ayra Starr	22 January 2021		Mavin Records	Sound Engineer; Co-Producer
Ayra Starr	19 & Dangerous	6 August 2021		Mavin Records	Sound Engineer; Co-Producer
Ayra Starr	The Year I Turned 21	31 May 2024		Mavin Records	Sound Engineer; Co-Producer
Chike	The Brother's Keeper	25 August 2022		Brother Records	Co-producer
Simi	Lost and Found	5 July 2024		Studio Brat	Primary Producer; Sound Engineer
Black Sherif	Iron Boy	3 April 2025		Blacko, and Empire	Co-producer
Davido	5ive	18 April 2025		DMW, Columbia, and Sony	Co-producer

== Songwritting credits ==
Songwritting credits
Release date	Song title	Artist	Album release	Certifications (sales thresholds)	
10 February 2023	"Sability"	Ayra Starr	Non-album single	Certifications (sales thresholds)	TCSN: Platinum

== Accolades ==
Year	Awards ceremony	Award description(s)	Results
2021	The Beatz Awards	Afro-R&B Producer of the Year	Nominated
2023	The Beatz Awards	Afro Soul Producer of the Year	Won
2024	The Beatz Awards	Male Producer of the Year	Nominated
2024	The Beatz Awards	Afro R&B Producer of the Year	Nominated
2024	The Beatz Awards	Afro Dancehall Producer of the Year	Nominated
2025	Africa Magic Viewers' Choice Awards	Best Score/Music	Nominated
