= Forever (Gyakie song) =

2020 Song by Gyakie

Song by Gyakie

from the EP Seed
- Released: 7 August 2020
- Genre: Afrobeats
- Length: 3:16
- Label: SME Africa; Flip The Music
- Songwriters: Jackline Acheampong; Stanley Omah Didia
- Producer: Constant Afun

Gyakie chronology
"Joy and Happiness (Intro)" (2020)	"Forever" (2020)	"Whine" (2020)

Music video
- "Forever (Official music video)"

Official audio
- "Forever (Official Audio)"

Lyric video
- "Forever (Official Lyric Video)"

"Forever" is a song by Ghanaian singer-songwriter Gyakie from her debut five-track extended play Seed - EP, it was released on 7 August 2020 and accompanied by the visuals that premiered the same day on YouTube.

The song was released through SM Entertainment West Africa under exclusive license from Jackline Acheampong (Flip The Music). It was certified Platinum in South Africa by the Recording Industry of South Africa (RiSA).

== Remix ==
"Forever (Remix)"

Remix by Gyakie and Omah Lay

from the EP Seed
- Released: 20 March 2021
- Genre: Afrobeats
- Length: 3:21
- Label: SME Africa; Flip The Music
- Songwriters: Jackline Acheampong; Stanley Omah Didia
- Producer: Constant Afun

Gyakie chronology
"Whine" (2020)	"Forever (Remix)" (2021)	"NEED ME" (2021)

Omah Lay chronology
"Damn" (2020)	"Forever (Remix)" (2021)	"Understand" (2021)

Music video
- "Forever (Remix) (Official music video)"

Official audio
- "Forever (Remix) (Official Audio)"

On 20 March 2021 the song was remixed with vocals from Nigerian singer-songwriter Omah Lay. The remix debuted and peaked at number one on the Turntable charts and number 13 on TurnTable End of the Year Top 50 of 2021. It was also certified Platinum in South Africa by the Recording Industry of South Africa (RiSA).

== Certifications ==
Region	Certification	Certified units/sales
Nigeria (TCSN) Forever (Remix)	Platinum	100,000^{‡}
South Africa (RISA)	Platinum	20,000^{‡}
South Africa (RISA) Forever (Remix)	Platinum	20,000^{‡}
^{‡} Sales+streaming figures based on certification alone.
