= Bloody Samaritan =

2021 single by Ayra Starr

Single by Ayra Starr

from the album 19 & Dangerous
- Released: 30 July 2021
- Genre: Afropop
- Length: 3:07
- Label: Mavin
- Songwriter: Oyinkansola Sarah Aderibigbe
- Producer: London

Ayra Starr singles chronology
"Away" (2021)	"Bloody Samaritan" (2021)	"Rush" (2022)

Music video
- "Bloody Samaritan" on YouTube

"Bloody Samaritan" is a song recorded by Nigerian singer-songwriter Ayra Starr. It was released on 30 July 2021, as the lead single from her debut studio album, 19 & Dangerous (2021), through Mavin Records. Prior to its arrival on streaming platforms, the song premiered on BBC Radio 1Xtra. Written by Ayra Starr and produced by London, it is an Afropop song with empowering lyrics about pursuing one's dreams despite detractors and other people's negative opinions.

"Bloody Samaritan" received positive reception for its message and production. It peaked atop Nigeria's TurnTable Top 50, making Ayra Starr the first female artist in the history of the chart to reach number-one with a solo song. Outside Nigeria, it peaked at number 4 on the Afrobeats Singles Chart in the UK.

== Background ==
During the week of 11 July 2021, Ayra Starr announced plans to release her debut studio album. On 19 July, she posted the teaser trailer for the new album on social media, revealing the title as 19 & Dangerous and its release date to be 6 August. In the same teaser, an excerpt of a 2001 Eartha Kitt interview can be heard, in which Kitt states:

Life is not problematical. We make it problematical, because we are all listening to someone else, to something, without listening to ourselves. We cover up our lives with insignificant things that have no value at all.

On 27 July, Ayra Starr announced "Bloody Samaritan" as the album's lead single along with a release date of 30 July 2021. The song premiered on BBC Radio 1Xtra on 28 July 2021. After its premiere, Ayra Starr uploaded a 22-second video clip onto Twitter of her listening to the song with producer London in a recording studio. She stated in an interview that she was inspired to write the song while she was feeling "very sort of pressured by society and all that." The track was mixed and mastered by Johnny Drille.

== Production and composition ==
"Bloody Samaritan" was written by Ayra Starr and produced by London. Of the 11 songs on the album, it was the longest to complete, taking up five months of writing and recording. Ayra Starr said in an interview with Clash that the song was "very challenging" and "very hard to make."

"Bloody Samaritan" is an Afropop song, with jazz, neo-soul and EDM-influenced instrumentation. The song is three minutes and seven seconds in length. In terms of musical notation, the song was composed using 4/4 common time, performed in the key of G♯ minor, with a moderate tempo of 105 beats per minute. It features a basic chord progression of G♯m-C♯m^{7}-Emaj^{7}.

According to Ayra Starr, "Bloody Samaritan" is a metaphor for disingenuous concern for others. She revealed that "[she] was unapologetic and assertive on it – something people [her] age often struggle to be, and [she] want [her] fans to feel that way when they listen to it, liberated of societal standards and expectations." In an interview with NotJustOk, she stated that in the middle of the chorus, "Na my pastor say I be my healer, everything I desire I go receive", she was affirming herself as the controller of her own fate. She said, "Like I'm now my own healer and my destiny, my life is not in the hands of my pastor, it's just between me and God. So if I don't believe it, it wouldn't happen."

== Critical reception ==
Alphonse Pierre of Pitchfork found that "Bloody Samaritan" while fundamentally Afropop exhibits influences from neo-soul and freestyle rap. Pierre complimented the song's "catchy" production and Ayra Starr's vocal delivery and noted it as "the type of song where the prominence of each element depends on where you are." NME's Sophie Williams said the song "hinges on this unshakable confidence, full of vivid, bolshy kiss-offs to the haters, wondering how to be someone they’ll envy for eternity."

== Kelly Rowland remix ==
"Bloody Samaritan"

Remix by Ayra Starr featuring Kelly Rowland

from the album 19 & Dangerous Deluxe
- Released: September 28, 2022
- Length: 3:09
- Label: Marvin Global Holdings

Kelly Rowland chronology
"Black Magic" (2021)	"Bloody Samaritan" (2022)

A remix of the song featuring American singer Kelly Rowland was released on September 28, 2022. A performance video was also released, featuring the two singers.

== Sun-El Musician remix ==
"Bloody Samatarian"

Remix by Ayra Starr featuring Sun-El Musician

from the album 19 & Dangerous Deluxe
- Released: June 15, 2022
- Length: 3:00
- Label: Marvin Global Holdings
- Producer: Sanele Sithole

Sun-El Musician chronology
"Higher" (2021)	"Bloody Samatarian" (2022)	"Respond" (2022)

A remix of the song featuring South African DJ Sun-El Musician was released on June 15, 2022.

== Music videos ==
Two music videos were shot to promote "Bloody Samaritan". The first featured the singer performing the song alongside a violin player and a saxophone player. The second video was directed by Starr herself and Loup Garou who previously directed her single, "Away." It was released through Starr's official YouTube channel on 31 August 2021, and marked her directorial debut. The video was made on a much lower budget than Starr's previous music videos. On its concept, Starr said in an interview with Clash: "I just want people to see my personality. No need for stories. No need for somebody to bring a knife and bring it like being bloody or being the vibe. I don't want any literal meaning."

== Credits and personnel ==
- Ayra Starr – vocals, songwriting
- London – production
- Johnny Drille – mixing, mastering

== Charts ==
=== Weekly charts ===
Weekly chart performance for "Bloody Samaritan"
Chart (2021)	Peak position
Nigeria (TurnTable Top 50)	1
UK Afrobeats (Official Charts)	4
Top Triller Global (Billboard)	14

Weekly chart performance for "Bloody Samaritan" (Remix) featuring Kelly Rowland
Chart (2022)	Peak position
Suriname (Nationale Top 40)	34
Nigeria TurnTable Top 50	66

== Certifications ==
Certifications for "Bloody Samaritan"
Region	Certification	Certified units/sales
United Kingdom (BPI)	Silver	200,000^{‡}
^{‡} Sales+streaming figures based on certification alone.
