= Monalisa (Lojay and Sarz song) =

2021 song by Lojay and Sarz

Song by Lojay and Sarz

from the album LV N ATTN
- Language: English; Yoruba; Nigerian Pidgin
- Released: 4 June 2021
- Genre: Afrobeats; amapiano
- Length: 3:33
- Label: Metallic Music
- Songwriters: Lekan Onifeso Jnr; Osabuohien Osaretin
- Producer: Sarz

Music video
- "Monalisa" on YouTube

"Monalisa" is a song by Nigerian singer Lojay and Nigerian record producer Sarz. A blend of Afrobeats and amapiano, it appeared as the fifth track off their joint EP LV N ATTN (2021), and was produced by Sarz. The song earned Sarz the award for Producer of the Year at The Headies 2022. It was also nominated for Song of the Year, Best Afrobeats Single of the Year, and Viewer's Choice at the same event. "Monalisa" received further nominations for African Song of the Year at the 3Music Awards 2022, Best Single at the 2023 Urban Music Awards, Best Artist, Duo or Group in African Contemporary at the All Africa Music Awards 2021, and African Fan's Favorite at the All Africa Music Awards 2022. The music video for "Monalisa" was directed by UAX and filmed in Lagos.

A remix to "Monalisa" featuring American singer Chris Brown was released after the song's breakthrough. Following its release, "Monalisa" achieved international success, receiving airplay on BBC 1Xtra, BBC Radio 1, Kiss, and Capital Xtra, and appearing at number 30 on The Fader's list of the 100 Best Songs of the Year.

== Background ==
"Monalisa" was a sleeper hit, as it was originally released on 4 June 2021 as the fifth track off the collaborative EP LV N ATTN. Lojay and Sarz met during the COVID-19 lockdown in 2020 through a mutual friend who was Lojay's lawyer. Sarz agreed to collaborate after being drawn to Lojay's "unique" vocal delivery. The pair recorded "Monalisa" during sessions for LV N ATTN. According to Lojay, the song was initially overlooked in favor of the EP's title track featuring Wizkid, which they expected to be the main single. Sarz, on the other hand, believed "Monalisa" would eventually outshine the other songs on the project. Musically, the song combines Afrobeats and amapiano elements, produced at a time when amapiano was gaining momentum in Nigeria. Sarz first created the beat without log drums but later added them to reflect the growing influence of the genre. Lojay described "Monalisa" as "an Afrobeats song with an Amapiano influence," while Sarz cited South African house and Amapiano as inspirations for its production.

== Reception ==
"Monalisa" received positive reviews from critics. Frank Ude of Doth Music described the song as a "humble club-ready mini-banger," praising Lojay's "crooned lines running over Sarz's afro-pop production" and rated it 8.3 out of 10. Ude highlighted its suitability for dance playlists despite calling it "nothing out of the ordinary" for Afropop. Reviewing the LV N ATTN EP, Pulse Nigeria's Motolani Alake said that Lojay "adorns the female body like a temple" on "Monalisa," citing his "delicately crafted lyrics" and his mix of Yoruba, Pidgin, and English.

Adewojumi Aderemi of The Native, also reviewing LV N ATTN, called the song a "fun dance number," describing it as a "Lojay masterclass" and commending Sarz for adding "rapid shakers" and "mellow chords." She added that Sarz and Lojay's chemistry resulted in "back-to-back bangers" and recommended that Niniola should be on the track. In a review of the Chris Brown remix, Mufaro Mujuru of Grungecake called it "relishable and groovy," describing it as "a danceable Amapiano-influenced piece with a catchy and repetitive chorus." Mujuru praised Lojay's "sultry vocals" and Brown's "at-home" contribution with Nigerian Pidgin, while commending Sarz's production for being detailed "without spoiling the broth."

== Accolades ==
Year	Awards ceremony	Award description(s)	Results
2021	All Africa Music Awards	Best Artiste, Duo or Group in African Contemporary	Nominated
2022	3Music Awards	African Song of the Year	Nominated
2022	The Headies	Song of the Year	Nominated
2022	The Headies	Best Afrobeats Single	Nominated
2022	The Headies	Viewer's Choice	Nominated
2022	African Entertainment Awards USA	Song of the Year	Nominated
2022	African Entertainment Awards USA	Best Collaboration	Nominated
2023	All Africa Music Awards	African Fan's Favorite	Nominated
2023	Urban Music Awards	Best Single	Nominated

== Remix ==
"Monalisa (Remix)"

Remix by Lojay and Sarz featuring Chris Brown
- Released: 19 May 2022
- Genre: Afrobeats; amapiano
- Length: 3:32
- Label: Metallic Music
- Songwriters: Lekan Onifeso Jnr; Osabuohien Osaretin; Christopher Brown
- Producer: Sarz

Chris Brown chronology
"WE (Warm Embrace)" (2022)	"Monalisa (Remix)" (2022)	"Call Me Every Day" (2022)

Lyric video
- "Monalisa (Remix)" on YouTube

The official remix to "Monalisa" featuring American singer Chris Brown was released on 20 May 2022 after the song's breakthrough. In an interview, Lojay said he collaborated with Chris Brown on the remix to help the song reach a wider global audience. Brown recorded his verse soon after receiving the track. During Brown's set at the 2022 Wireless Festival in London, Lojay joined him on stage to perform the song.

== Charts ==
=== Weekly charts ===
Chart performance for "Monalisa"
Chart (2021)	Peak position
Nigeria (TurnTable)	7
UK Afrobeats Singles (OCC)	3

Chart performance for "Monalisa (Remix)" with Chris Brown
Chart (2022)	Peak position
Nigeria (TurnTable Top 100)	38
Netherlands (Dutch Top 40)	4
New Zealand Hot Singles (RMNZ)	30
US Afrobeats Songs (Billboard)	8
UK Indie (OCC)	19
UK Singles (OCC)	99

=== Year-end charts ===
2021 year-end chart positions for "Monalisa"
Chart (2021)	Position
End of the Year Top 50 (TurnTable)	23

2022 year-end chart positions for "Monalisa" (remix) featuring Chris Brown
Chart (2022)	Position
Year-End U.S. Afrobeats Songs (Billboard)	28
End of the Year Top 100 (TurnTable)	41

== Certifications ==
Certifications for "Monalisa" or "Monalisa (Remix)"
Region	Certification	Certified units/sales
Canada (Music Canada)	Gold	40,000^{‡}
France (SNEP)	Gold	100,000^{‡}
New Zealand (RMNZ)	Gold	15,000^{‡}
Nigeria (TCSN)	Platinum	100,000^{‡}
United Kingdom (BPI)	Gold	400,000^{‡}
^{‡} Sales+streaming figures based on certification alone.
