= Ndlovu Youth Choir =

South African musical group

- Ndlovu Youth Choir at 2026 Edinburgh Festival Fringe

Background information
- Origin: Limpopo
- Genres: Afro Pop
- Years active: 2009–present
- Label: Sony

The Ndlovu Youth Choir is a South African musical group founded in 2009.

Their debut studio album Africa (2019) debuted number one in South Africa.

== History ==
Ndlovu Youth Choir was formed in January 2009 by Ndlovu Care Group childcare community based in Elandsdoorn, Limpopo.

In October 2018, they released a single titled "Shape of You" with South African flautist Wouter Kellerman. The song won Best Independent Music Video at the Hollywood Music Awards.

Towards the end of 2019, they auditioned on America's Got Talent season 14 and reached the finals, but did not make the top five.

They signed a record deal with Syco Entertainment joint venture with Sony and began recording their debut studio album Africa after they returned from America’s Got Talent.

Their debut studio album Africa was released on November 29, 2019. The album won Best Adult Contemporary Album and debuted number one in South Africa.

Their second album Rise was released on December 11, 2020.

Their third studio album Grateful was released on April 29, 2022. They collaborated with 25K, Sun-El Musician, Tyler ICU and the National Youth Choirs of Great Britain.

In 2025, a translation of "Bohemian Rhapsody" into Zulu language was authorized by surviving members of Queen and the Mercury Phoenix Trust. The Zulu version is performed by the Ndlovu Youth Choir under artistic director Ralf Schmitt, and combines isicathamiya (an a capella style) with kwassa kwassa (a type of music and dance from the Democratic Republic of Congo).

Towards the end of January 2026, the choir announced their upcoming South Afican tour that would run from February 5, until August 2. They made their debut at the Edinburgh Fringe in 2026, appearing at the Assembly Rooms (August 6–30).

== Discography ==
- Africa (2019)
- Rise (2020)
- Grateful (2022)
- Celebrate (2023)

== Awards ==
=== Hollywood Music Awards ===
Year	Nominee / work	Award	Result
2018	"Shape of You"	Best Independent Music Video	Won

=== South African Music Awards ===
Year	Nominee / work	Award	Result	Ref.
2020	Africa	Best Adult Contemporary Album	Won	
2020	Ndlovu Youth Choir	International Achievement Award	Won	
