= LV N ATTN =

EP by Lojay and Sarz
- Released: 4 June 2021
- Genre: Afro-fusion
- Length: 14:44
- Label: Metallic; 1789
- Producer: Sarz

Lojay chronology
Midnight Vibes (2017)	LV N ATTN (2021)	Gangster Romantic (2023)

Sarz chronology
I Love Girls with Trobul (2019)	LV N ATTN (2021)	Sweetness (2021)

Singles from LV N ATTN
- 1. "Tonongo" Released: 30 April 2021

LV N ATTN (an abbreviation for Love and Attention) is a collaborative EP by Nigerian singer Lojay and Nigerian record producer Sarz. Released on 4 June 2021 through Metallic Music and 1789 Records, it fuses genres like Afrobeats, R&B, hip-hop, and electro, and features a sole guest appearance from Wizkid. Produced entirely by Sarz, LV N ATTN was preceded by the single "Tonongo" and spawned "Monalisa", whose remix with Chris Brown peaked at the eighth position on the Billboard U.S. Afrobeats Songs chart.

== Background and recording ==
Lojay met Sarz through his lawyer. He was initially hoping to work on a single song but Sarz insisted on creating a full EP to better express Lojay's sound, which led to a three-month-long studio session in Lagos during the COVID-19 pandemic. Prior to the pair collaborating, Sarz has collaborated on previous projects with Flash and Wurld. "LV N ATTN", the album's title track, developed after Lojay had recorded a version in Lagos over a beat sent by Sarz. According to Lojay, Wizkid joined the recording session for the title track after Sarz suggested featuring him on the song, although no features were planned on the EP.

=== Singles ===
The EP's only single "Tonongo", was released on 30 April 2021. The song was inspired by an experience Lojay had at a strip club in Lagos. Pulse Nigeria said the song "showcases Lojay's sublime vocals alongside Sarz's slick production which blends contemporary Afrobeats with urgent Hip-Hop and sensual R&B sounds".

== Composition ==
The EP opens with "Tonongo", which blends Afro-pop and R&B and was inspired by Lojay's experiences at a Lagos strip club. "Park O X3" incorporates rock-influenced production. The title track, "LV N ATTN", features Wizkid and blends Afrobeats and R&B.

"Panty!" draws from afro-fusion and dancehall, while "Monalisa" incorporates amapiano rhythms. Across the EP, Lojay performs in English, Yoruba, Nigerian Pidgin and hints of Patois, with lyrics centered on love, romance and sexuality.

== Critical reception ==
Professional ratings
Review scores
Source	Rating
The 49th Street	8.2/10
Afrocritik	7/10
Pulse Nigeria	6.9/10

Motolani Alake of Pulse Nigeria described Lojay as "an R&B artist who projects through elements of Afro-pop" and noted that the EP blends Sarz's production with "Lojay's masterful blend of falsetto-backed love chronicles with a soul of relatable lamba", giving it a rating of 6.9/10. Fatiat Saliu of Afrocritik deemed LV N ATTN "explosive" and "worthy of multiple listens", saying that Lojay "showcases his unique vocal capability and unreal songwriting skills" across the EP, and gave it a rating of 7/10. Adewojumi Aderemi of The Native admired the EP for its "cool eclectic blend of world genres".

Chinonso Ihekire of Guardian Life praised Lojay's "brilliant lyricism heavily woven around sultry sensual/romantic love themes", concluding that "With Sarz's guidance, Lojay is now stepping into the limelight. And from all indications, he is here for a long time". Writing for The Lagos Review, Emmanuel Daraloye said LV N ATTN showed Lojay "swiftly mov[ing] from sex talk to love talk and vice versa" over Sarz's production. Oris Aigbokhaevbolo of Music in Africa said that "Sarz adds sophistication to Lojay's obvious vocal talent", concluding that Lojay "deserves his own... love and attention." Alonge Dominic of the 49th Street said the EP "has no single bad song", adding that "we cannot help but expect exhilarating greatness from this new kid on the block" and rating it an 8.2/10.

== Track listing ==
All tracks were written by Lekan "Lojay" Onifeso Jr. (Note: All except track 3, which was written by Onifeso and Ayodeji "Wizkid" Balogun) and were produced by Osabuohien "Sarz" Osaretin.

LV N ATTN track listing
No.	Title	Length
1.	"Tonongo"	2:29
2.	"Park O X3"	2:40
3.	"LV N ATTN" (featuring Wizkid)	3:33
4.	"Panty!"	2:26
5.	"Monalisa"	3:33
Total length:		14:44

== Release history ==
Release history and formats for LV N ATTN
Region	Date	Format	Label
Various	4 June 2021	Streaming; digital download	Metallic; 1789
