= Memories That Last Forever 2 =

2023 studio album by The Sarz Academy

Memories That Last Forever 2 (MTLF 2)

Compilation album by the Sarz Academy
- Released: July 19, 2023
- Recorded: 2022–2023
- Genre: Afrofusion
- Length: 42:37
- Label: 1789; United Masters; Warner Music Africa
- Producer: Sarz; Oddwave; O.S.O; Twitchpapii; Thekidfuzzy; BomboCat; Blueszn; Chibooplaythebeat; Dartz

The Sarz Academy chronology
Memories That Last Forever (2020)	Memories That Last Forever 2 (MTLF 2) (2023)

Singles from Memories That Last Forever 2
- 1. "Jam One Kele" Released: May 12, 2023; 2. "Good To Me" Released: June 7, 2023; 3. "Body Wicked" Released: June 7, 2023

Memories That Last Forever 2 is a collaborative album by The Sarz Academy Alumni. It was released on July 19, 2023, by Sarz's record label 1789 under exclusive license to United Masters and in partnership with Warner Music. The album features seven vocalists and eight producers who are the 2022 Graduating class of the third Sarz Academy Masterclass.

The album is primarily an Afrofusion album and features elements of R&B and dancehall. The album was a sequel to Memories That Last Forever EP (2020) which was the first body of work created by Sarz and three members of the second graduating set of The Sarz Academy; P.Priime, Tempo and Dunnie. The EP featured acts like Tiwa Savage, Niniola, Wizkid, Waje amongst others.

== Background ==
The Sarz Academy alumni began recording Memories That Last Forever 2 during their masterclass period in 2022.

== Track listing ==
No.	Title	Writer(s)	Producer(s)	Length
1.	"Breath" (Sarz, Perfext)	Akanji Richard; Okeke Promise Chidozie	Blueszn	02:54
2.	"Resemble" (Sarz, Fxrtune)	Fortune Olisaemeka Ohuizu; Sebastian Del Fernandez	BomboCat	02:12
3.	"233" (Sarz, Charmaine'LA)	Charmaine Olaitan Audifferen; Irewunmi Michael Oluwatimilehin	Twitchpapii	02:12
4.	"Good To Me" (Sarz, Gimba, Perfext)	Alhassan Gimba Chukwubuikem; Irewunmi Michael Oluwatimilehin; Okeke Promise Chidozie; Sabastian Del Gallego Fernandez	BomboCat; Twitchpapii	03:34
5.	"Sad Love" (Sarz, Millymay_Pod, Syntiat)	Chijioke Chinazor Emmanuel; Macaulay-Smith Prince; Sanni Sintiat Omodolapo	Chibooplaythebeat	02:50
6.	"Inside Life" (Sarz, Fxrtune)	Asuquo-Eyo Bless Daniel; Fortune Olisaemeka Ohuizu; Irewunmi Michael Oluwatimilehin	Dartz; Twitchpapii	02:48
7.	"Only Man" (Sarz, Gimba)	Alhassan Gimba Chukwubuikem; Tom Joshua	Oddwave	02:46
8.	"Steady" (Sarz, Gimba, Charmaine'LA)	Alhassan Gimba Chukwubuikem; Charmaine Olaitan Audifferen; Irewunmi Michael Oluwatimilehin; Tom Joshua	Twitchpapii; Oddwave	02:57
9.	"Rude" (Sarz, Syntiat)	Opeyemi Stephen Okulaja; Sanni Sintiat Omodoladpo	O.S.O	02:36
10.	"Ready" (Sarz, Fxrtune, Pjstar)	Akanji Richard; Fortune Olisaemeka Ohuizu; Raymond Pius Ehi; Tom Joshua; Opeyemi Stephen Okulaja	O.S.O; Blueszn; Oddwave	03:05
11.	"DPWMH" (Sarz, Millymay_Pod, Pjstar)	Akanji Richard; Macaulay Smith Prince; Opeyemi Stephen Okulaja; Raymond Pius Ehi; Sabastian Del Gallego Fernandez	Blueszn; BomboCat; O.S.O	02:48
12.	"Body Wicked" (Sqrz, Millymay_Pod)	Famakinwa Obafemi; Macaulay Smith Prince	Thekidfuzzy	03:11
13.	"More" (Sarz, Perfext)	Irewunmi Michael Oluwatimilehin; Okeke Promise Chidozie	Twitchpapii	02:50
14.	"Buga" (Sarz, Fxrtune)	Famakinwa Obafemi; Fortune Olisaemeka Ohuizu	Thekidfuzzy	03:16
15.	"Jam One Kele" (Sarz, Gimba, Fxrtune, Millymay_Pod)	Alhassan Gimba Chukwubuikem; Fortune Olisaemeka Ohuizu; Irewunmi Michael Oluwatimilehin; Macaulay Smith Prince; Sebastian Del Gallego Fernandez; Tom Joshua	Oddwave; BomboCat; Twitchpapii	02:29
Total length:				42:37
