= Ayra Starr =

Beninese-born Nigerian singer (born 2002)

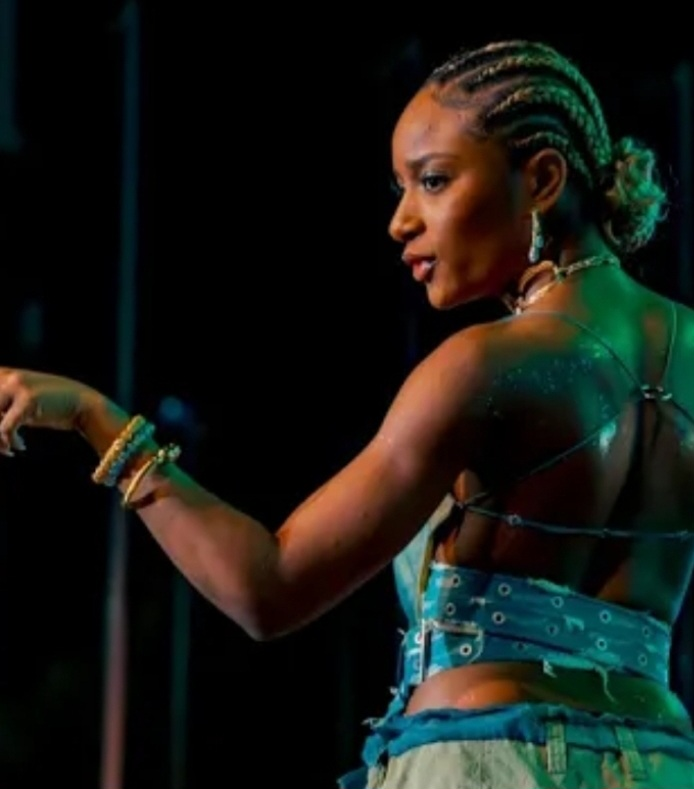
- Starr performing in 2023
- Born: Oyinkansola Sarah Aderibigbe; 14 June 2002 (age 24); Cotonou, Benin
- Education: Les Cours Sonou University
- Occupation: Singer • songwriter
- Years active: 2021–present
- Works: Discography; songs; videography; performances
- Awards: Full list
- Musical career
- Genres: Afrobeats; R&B; alté; Afro-pop
- Instrument: Vocals
- Labels: Mavin; Republic; Roc Nation
- Website: ayrastarr.com

Oyinkansola Sarah Aderibigbe (born 14 June 2002), known professionally as Ayra Starr (/ˈaɪrə ˈstɑːr/ EYE-rə-star), is a Beninese-born Nigerian singer-songwriter and producer.

In early 2021, Starr released her self-titled debut EP and its lead single, "Away". Her debut EP was followed by the release of her debut studio album, 19 & Dangerous (2021). The album appeared in year-end lists by publications such as NativeMag. The lead single, "Bloody Samaritan," became the first song by a solo female artist to reach the No. 1 position in the Top 50 charts. In August of that same year, Starr was ranked No. 3 on Billboard's Next Big Sound.

Starr achieved international recognition in 2022 with the release of her song "Rush" which charted in several countries, including Switzerland, Ireland, and the United Kingdom. The song earned Starr a nomination for the 66th Annual Grammy Awards for Best African Music Performance. Her second studio album, The Year I Turned 21, was released in 2024, whereas her third studio album, Starr Girl, was released in August 2026.

== Life and career ==
=== Early life ===
Oyinkansola Sarah Aderibigbe was born in Benin and raised in Cotonou and Lagos, Nigeria. She is of Nigerian (specifically Yoruba) heritage, with both parents from Kwara State. She speaks Yoruba, French, English, and Nigerian Pidgin.

She is the second of five children. She and her older brother, Damilola, played music together during their childhood.

Though she gravitated toward the arts as a teen, her father often urged her to prioritize academics. She attended Les Cours Sonou University in Cotonou and received a BA degree in international relations and political science. Aderibigbe's mother supported her musical ambitions and reportedly encouraged her to pursue a singing career.

=== 2018–2020: Career beginnings ===
Starr finished in second place on the Nigerian television talent show Maltina Dance All as a child. In August 2018, Starr signed with Quove Models, a Lagos-based modeling agency.

In 2019, Starr started posting song covers by artists such as Andra Day and 2Face Idibia on social media. The stage name "Ayra Starr" is of Arabic origin, meaning “somebody that is highly respected." She also appeared in the music video for Eri Ife's song "Dear Future Wife."

In December 2019, Starr uploaded an original song called "Damage" to her Instagram page. After this, Mavin Records founder Don Jazzy sent her a message expressing interest in her music and inviting her to meet. Starr's first sessions at Mavin Studios were her introduction to professional recording. Throughout 2020, she recorded at Mavin Studios in Lagos with producers Louddaaa, Don Jazzy, and Dayogrey.

=== 2021–2023: Ayra Starr and 19 & Dangerous ===
Ayra Starr performs "Rush" at Shoke Shoke Festival in Kenya, 2023.

Her self-titled debut EP was released in January 2021 through Mavin Records. The mixing and mastering of the EP was by Ikon, Louddaaa, and Johnny Drille. Shortly after its release, the EP became the number-one album on Nigeria iTunes and Apple Music. The EP includes the track "Away", which peaked at number four on Nigeria's TurnTable Top 50 and number 17 on US Billboard Top Triller Global. Its accompanying music video also debuted on MTV Base's Official Naija Top 10. OkayAfrica included the song in their list of The 9 Best Nigerian Songs of January 2021. In early 2021, Crayon's EP Twelve A.M was released, including her as a featured artist on "In Sync." She then performed for the UC Berkeley Nigerian Students Association's Olori Awards.

In July 2021, Starr performed for the season finale of Nigerian Idol. On 6 August, her debut studio album titled 19 & Dangerous was released. The album marked her first time recording alongside guest artists, such as Fousheé and CKay. It included two top forty hits on the TurnTable Top 50, and Starr ranked number two on Billboard's Next Big Sound. Her highest chart position was with "Bloody Samaritan," which became Starr's first number-one single on the chart. Starr was nominated for the "Best Newcomer Award" at the 8th African Muzik Magazine Awards in October of that year.

In September 2022, Starr released the song "Rush" as part of the deluxe edition of 19 & Dangerous. The song charted in several territories, including Switzerland, Ireland, and the United Kingdom. "Rush" earned Starr her nomination at the 66th Annual Grammy Awards for Best African Music Performance. On 10 November, Starr was featured on "2 Sugar," a track from Wizkid's fifth studio album More Love, Less Ego. The song reached number 1 on Billboard's Hot Trending, and debuted at number 5 on the Billboard U.S. Afrobeats Songs chart.

In March 2023, she was credited on Creed III's soundtrack with "Ogogoro". Shortly after this, in July 2023, she announced her first headlining world tour, 21: The World Tour, with 40 stops across North America, Europe, Africa, and Australia. The lead single from her next album, "Rhythm & Blues," was released in September 2023, exploring themes of romance and vulnerability. She was also featured on the David Guetta song "Big FU," along with rapper Lil Durk, which reached No. 23 on the U.S. Afrobeats Songs and No. 18 on New Zealand Top 40 charts.

=== 2024–2025: The Year I Turned 21 and international expansion ===
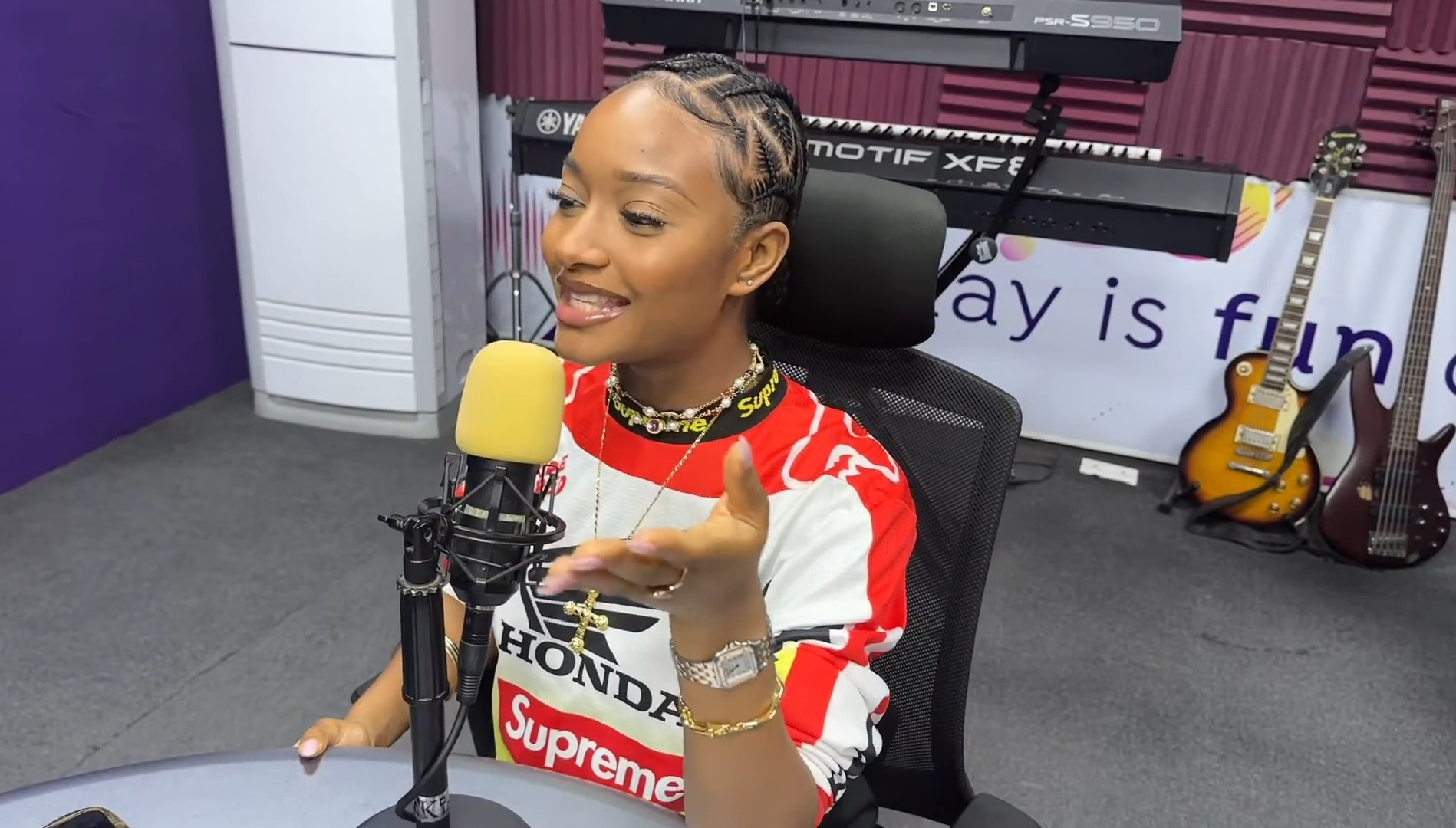
Starr during a 2024 radio interview at Ultima Studios in Lekki, where she spoke about her song "Commas".

The album's second single, "Commas," was released on 2 February 2024. In April, Jamaican record producer Rvssian released "Santa," a collaboration with Starr and reggaeton artist Rauw Alejandro. The track made Starr the first Nigerian female artist to reach 20 million monthly listeners on Spotify.

"Bad Vibes," featuring Seyi Vibez, was released on 10 May as the final single ahead of the album. Starr's second studio album, The Year I Turned 21, was released through Mavin Records on 31 May 2024. The album explores themes of self-discovery, love, grief, and empowerment. The album features guest appearances from Coco Jones, Giveon, Asake, Anitta and Rauw Alejandro. Upon its release, the album debuted at No. 1 on the Nigerian Albums Chart and entered the Billboard 200 at No. 195, making Starr the first Nigerian female artist to achieve this milestone. Pitchfork described the album as "a bold and reflective work that redefines modern Afropop." Billboard praised the album for its "universal themes of growth and ambition that resonate across cultures."

Following the album's release, she served as an opening act for Chris Brown's 2024 11:11 Tour across 26 North American cities from June to August. In June 2024, Starr made history as the first African female artist to perform on Glastonbury Festival's Pyramid Stage. She also headlined Afro Nation Detroit in August. She collaborated with Coldplay on the song "Good Feelings" from their album Moon Music and was a supporting act for the band's Music of the Spheres World Tour in Australia and New Zealand.

In February 2025, Starr released "All The Love". That same month she won Best African Music Act at the MOBO Awards. On 25 April, she released "Gimme Dat" featuring Wizkid, which pays homage to Wyclef Jean and Mary J. Blige's "911". In June, Starr won her first BET Award for Best International Act. Her Summer 2025 Tour kicked off on 20 June with a performance at Summerjam Festival in New Jersey. In mid-July, Starr signed an international management deal with Jay-Z's Roc Nation while remaining signed to Mavin Records for music releases. In joining Roc Nation, Starr entered into a strategic partnership aimed at expanding her global reach, particularly in the U.S. and Europe. On 25 July, she released "Hot Body", which Billboard called a "steamy slow-wine groove".

On 27 September, Starr performed at the Global Citizen Festival in New York City's Central Park. During her performance, Starr brought out her labelmate Rema as a surprise guest, and they performed "Rush" together. Following the performance, Starr and Rema released their first official collaboration as co-lead artists titled "Who's Dat Girl" on 17 October. In November 2025, she headlined the Tidal Rave Festival at La Palm Royal Beach Hotel in Accra, becoming the first major non-Ghanaian artist to headline the event.

=== 2026–present: Starr Girl ===
In January 2026, she was announced as a contributing artist on the original motion picture soundtrack for GOAT, an animated film produced by Sony Pictures Animation, appearing on the track "Brought the Family", a collaboration with Jon Bellion. Starr was featured in Spotify's "Our Frequency" zine Issue 033, where she discussed her aspirations and confirmed she was working on her third studio album, expected later in the year. In February 2026, she was added to the lineup for BRED Abu Dhabi's fourth edition at Yas Marina Circuit. She provided a verse for the remix of "Mon Bébé" by French artist RnBoi. In March 2026, she released her single "Where Do We Go", previewing it live for the first time the next day at a surprise appearance during the Brooklyn Museum's First Saturdays program in New York City. The song debuted at number four on the Billboard U.S. Afrobeats Songs chart and at number ten on Nigeria's Official Top 100, becoming her 19th top-ten entry on that chart and the most by any female artist in its history. It peaked at number three on the UK Afrobeats Singles Chart, spending four weeks in the top ten. A remix of the track with DJ Peggy Gou followed in the weeks after. On 26 March 2026, she won Best International Act at the MOBO Awards, becoming the first African artist to win the category in consecutive years. On 27 March, Parlophone and Warner Music France released "Aye Kan (Are You Coming Back)", which features Starr, as the second single from Angélique Kidjo's 19th album Hope!!.

In April 2026, Starr performed "Where Do We Go" on The Jennifer Hudson Show, where she officially announced her third studio album, titled Starr Girl, scheduled for release in July 2026. The date was later pushed to 14 August 2026, when its cover art was unveiled across social media and on Roc Nation's website. In June 2026, she released the single "Tornado", featuring vocals from Fola, having previewed it in a run of live shows that included her NPR Tiny Desk Concerts set and a performance at Boiler Room London. "Tornado" peaked at number five on the UK Afrobeats Singles Chart. It also reached number seven on the TurnTable Top 100 and number six on the Billboard U.S. Afrobeats Songs chart. Later that month, Starr paid a courtesy call to Seychelles President Patrick Herminie at State House and performed at Stad Popiler in Victoria as part of the country's 50th independence anniversary celebrations. On 11 July 2026, she made her Calgary Stampede debut, headlining a free concert on the Coca-Cola Stage. On October 11, 2026, she also became the first African artist to perform at a halftime show for a NFL International Games football game. During this performance in London, she sang many songs including material from her latest album.

== Artistry ==
=== Influences ===
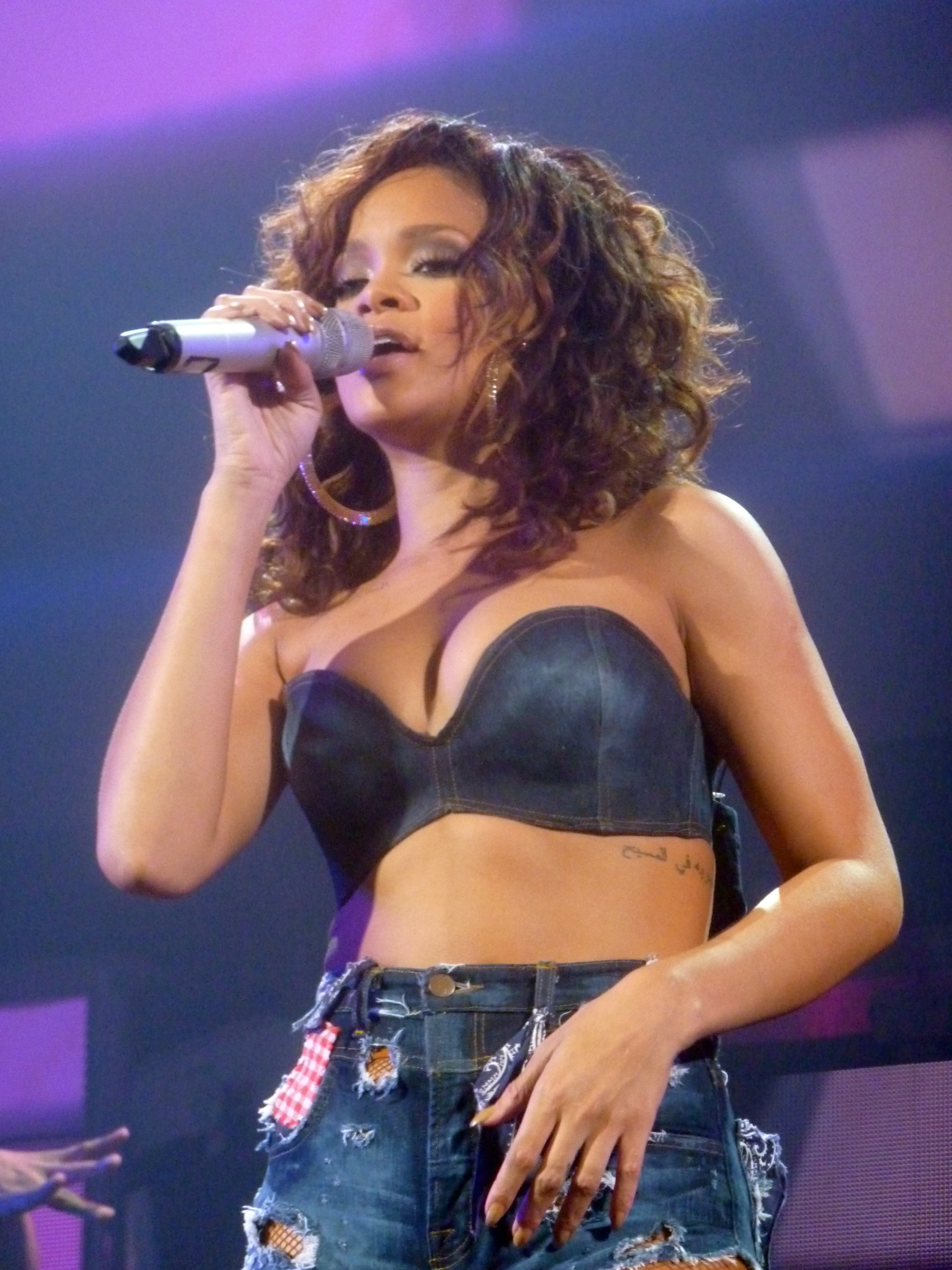
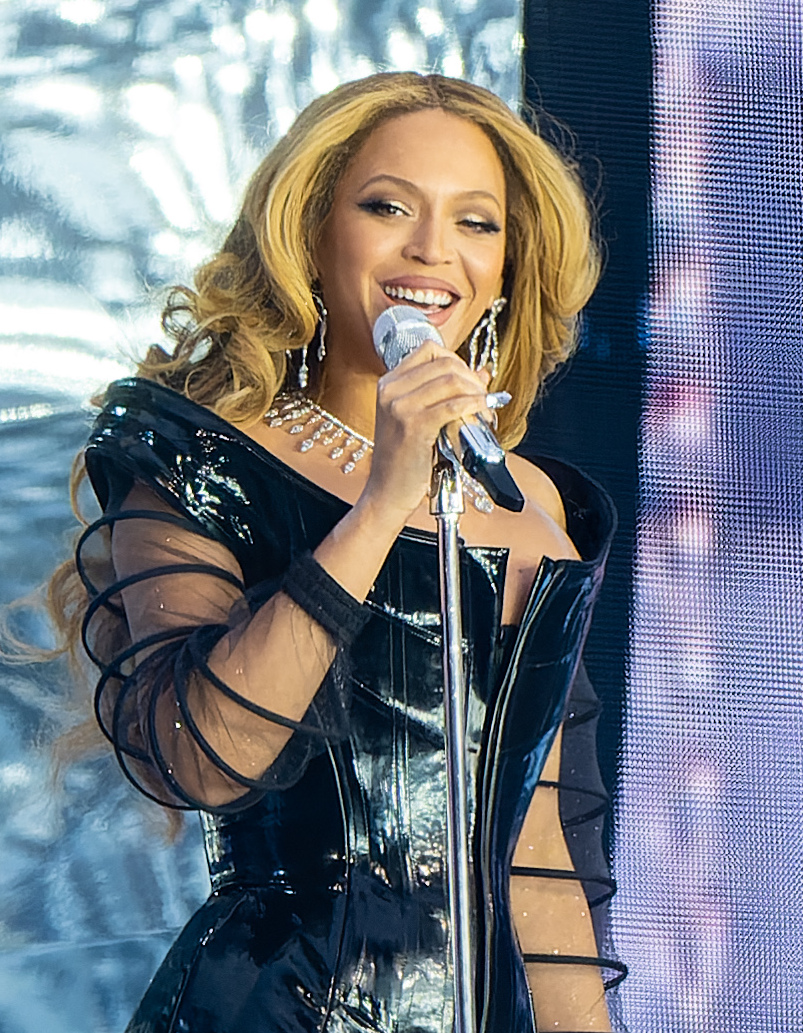
Rihanna (left) and Beyoncé (right) were among Starr's major influences during her formative years.

Starr grew up in a musically inclined family. She considers her mother, a former singer, and her brother Dami, a guitarist and songwriter, as her earliest inspirations for her interest in a music career.

In her interviews, she has stated that throughout her childhood she had a wide range of musical influences, primarily including Beyoncé and Rihanna. She has called herself a "Disney girl," recalling how she would regularly watch Disney Channel shows, mainly Hannah Montana, while aspiring to become "the Nigerian Hannah Montana". The Disney film Let It Shine and its lead female co-star Coco Jones also left a lasting impression on Starr's early creative development.

Following the success of "Bloody Samaritan" in 2021, Starr developed a mentorship relationship with Kelly Rowland, who joined the song's remix after it gained traction in the UK.

=== Musical style ===
Starr's sound has predominantly been categorized as Afropop and R&B, with music critics noting the dynamic nature of her range and emotional delivery. Her lyrics are a mixture of English, Nigerian Pidgin English and Yoruba. She often sings about contemporary topics such as love, relationships, empowerment and freedom.

Her album 19 & Dangerous explored mainly Afropop and R&B, but also introduced influences from neo-soul, jazz, and EDM. Critics praised her genre-fluid approach, with Oris Aigbokhaevbolo of Music in Africa noting that she "can work across genres while not quite sounding like anybody else." This versatility is also exemplified in her second studio album, The Year I Turned 21, which adopts a more introspective tone than her previous work, navigating themes of self-discovery and independence.

== Achievements ==
Starr has received various music accolades. In 2022, she was named the breakout artist of the year by Nigerian Entertainment Today. In 2023, she was included in the list of Forbes 30 Under 30 in music category. Spotify ranked Starr number one on its "Top 5 Female Afrobeats Artists in the Last 12 Months" list in 2025, describing her as "the pop star of Afrobeats." She is also the most-streamed female artist in Nigeria, having led Spotify's year-end ranking for four consecutive years (2022–2025), and became the first artist to achieve the same standing concurrently in Ghana and Kenya during 2023 and 2024.

She became the first female artist in the history of the Official Nigeria Top 100 Songs to reach number one with a solo single, and later set the record for the most number-one entries on the chart by a female artist, with four chart-topping credits. Her breakout single "Rush" achieved commercial success, becoming the most-streamed solo song by a Nigerian female artist on Spotify and making her the youngest African female artist to surpass 100 million views on a single YouTube video. The song earned multiple international certifications, including Platinum in the UK, Canada and New Zealand, and a Diamond in France. Her 2023 collaboration with Ninho, "No Love", was also certified Diamond by the SNEP in France and earned her first Gold certification in Switzerland.

"Santa" peaked within the top ten of charts in several Latin territories and made Starr the first Nigerian female artist to receive a Latin Diamond certification from the Recording Industry Association of America. "Santa" also achieved multi-platinum status in Spain and Mexico and peaked at number one in Spain and Bolivia, while charting across Italy, Portugal, Switzerland, and the Billboard Global 200. In 2024, her second album The Year I Turned 21 debuted at number one on the Official Nigeria Top 100 Albums. She is the first female Nigerian artist to surpass 20 million monthly listeners on streaming platform Spotify, where the album has garnered over 1 billion cumulative streams as of September 2025, making her the 6th most globally streamed black female artist.

In 2023, she became the youngest African female artist to headline a world tour, drawing audiences across North America, Europe, and Africa. In addition to her commercial and touring achievements, she was inducted into the Business of Fashion BoF 500, which identifies the most influential figures shaping the global fashion and creative economies.

== Other ventures ==
=== Endorsements ===
In September 2021, Starr became a brand ambassador for Pepsi Nigeria.

In March 2023, she was announced as the spokesperson for Maybelline New York across sub-Saharan Africa.

In February 2025, she signed an endorsement deal with New Balance alongside actor and musician Jaden Smith, becoming the face of the sportswear brand's latest campaign.

=== Fashion and magazine features ===
In 2021, Starr appeared in a Notion editorial. She was on the cover and appeared in an editorial for Wonderland magazine's winter issue as well. In July 2023, she was the cover star for Teen Vogue's inaugural "Africa's New Wave" issue alongside fellow artists BNXN and Victony.

In September 2024, she appeared on the cover of Dazed Magazine's Autumn 2024 issue, photographed by Zora Sicher. She has also appeared on covers for GQ South Africa, Numero, and Hunger. She made her runway debut in 2025 at the London Fashion Week, walking for Di Petsa and closing the show for the brand's Autumn/Winter 2025 collection. In June 2026, Starr was on one of the covers of Schön! Magazine's 50th issue, photographed by Cody Lidtke and styled by Dominick Barcelona. In the accompanying cover story, she discussed her appeal to listeners, stating, "I make music for confident women; people who have always known they were different. People listen to my music to feel good."

=== Acting ===
In 2024, she made her acting debut in the movie Christmas in Lagos, appearing as herself.

In March 2025, she was announced as part of the cast of Children of Blood and Bone, Paramount Pictures' adaptation of Tomi Adeyemi's bestselling novel, marking her acting debut alongside Viola Davis, Idris Elba, and Cynthia Erivo. The Gina Prince-Bythewood-directed film wrapped production in Lagos on 2 June, with a scheduled release date of 15 January 2027.

Invited Talks

On 17 April 2026, Starr delivered the opening keynote address at the 2026 Yale Africa Innovation Symposium (YAIS IV), where she spoke to students about leadership, taking risks, and pursuing creative dreams, drawing from her own journey as a young African artist. She wrote about this experience on her Substack.

== Discography ==
Studio albums

- 19 & Dangerous (2021)
- The Year I Turned 21 (2024)
- Starr Girl (2026)

== Tours ==
Headlining

- 21: The World Tour (2023)

Supporting

- Chris Brown – The 11:11 Tour (2024)
- Coldplay – Music of the Spheres World Tour (2024–2025)

== Awards and nominations ==
Award	Year	Recipient(s) and nominees(s)	Category	Result	Ref.
African Entertainment Awards USA	2021	Herself	Best New Artist	Nominated	
African Muzik Magazine Awards	2021	Herself	Best Newcomer	Nominated	
Mobo Awards	2026	Herself	Best International Act	Won	
Mobo Awards	2026	Herself	Best African Music Act	Nominated	
Mobo Awards	2021	Herself	Best African Music Act	Nominated	
Mobo Awards	2025	Herself	Best African Music Act	Won	
Mobo Awards	2025	Herself	Best International Act	Won	
Net Honours	2021	"Away"	Most Played R&B Song	Nominated	
Net Honours	2022	Herself	Breakout Artist of the Year (Female)	Won	
Net Honours	2022	Herself	Most Searched Musician (Female)	Nominated	
The Headies	2022	Herself	Next Rated	Nominated	
The Headies	2022	"Beggie Beggie" (feat. CKay)	Best R&B Single	Nominated	
The Headies	2022	"Beggie Beggie" (feat. CKay)	Best Collaboration	Nominated	
The Headies	2022	"Toxic"	Best Vocal Performance (Female)	Nominated	
The Headies	2022	"Bloody Samaritan"	Best Afrobeats Single of the Year	Nominated	
The Headies	2022	"Bloody Samaritan"	Headies' Viewer's Choice	Won	
The Headies	2022	19 & Dangerous	Best Afrobeats Album	Nominated	
The Headies	2022	19 & Dangerous	Album of the Year	Nominated	
The Headies	2024	"Last Heartbreak Song" (with Giveon)	Best R&B Single	Won	
BET Awards	2022	Herself	Best New International Act	Nominated	
BET Awards	2023	Herself	Best International Act	Nominated	
BET Awards	2024	"Commas"	BET Her Award	Nominated	
BET Awards	2024	Herself	Best New Artist	Nominated	
BET Awards	2024	Herself	Best International Act	Nominated	
BET Awards	2025	Herself	Best New Artist	Nominated	
BET Awards	2025	Herself	Best Female R&B/Pop Artist	Nominated	
BET Awards	2025	Herself	Best International Act	Won	
The Future Awards Africa	2022	Herself	Prize for Music	Nominated	
MTV Video Music Awards	2023	"Rush"	Best Afrobeats	Nominated	
MTV Video Music Awards	2023	"2 Sugar" (with Wizkid)	Best Afrobeats	Nominated	
MTV Video Music Awards	2024	"Last Heartbreak Song" (feat. Giveon)	Best Afrobeats	Nominated	
MTV Video Music Awards	2025	"Last Heartbreak Song"	Push Performance of the Year	Nominated	
Grammy Awards	2024	"Rush"	Best African Music Performance	Nominated	
Grammy Awards	2026	"Gimme Dat"	Best African Music Performance	Nominated	
3Music Awards	2024	"Sability"	African Song of the Year	Nominated	
3Music Awards	2024	Herself	African Act of the Year	Nominated	
MTV Europe Music Awards	2024	Herself	Best New	Nominated	
MTV Europe Music Awards	2024	Herself	Best Afrobeats	Nominated	
MTV Europe Music Awards	2024	Herself	Best Push	Nominated	
MTN Liberia Music Awards	2024	Herself	International Artist of the Year	Won	
TurnTable Music Awards	2024	Herself	Outstanding Achievement in Live Performance	Won	
AEAUSA 2024	2024	"Hypé" (Aya Nakamura feat. Ayra Starr)	Best Music Video	Nominated	
South African Music Awards	2025	The Year I Turned 21	Rest of Africa	Won	
Les Flammes	2025	"Hypé" (Aya Nakamura feat. Ayra Starr)	Morceau de l'année (Song of the Year)	Nominated	
Les Flammes	2025	"Hypé" (Aya Nakamura feat. Ayra Starr)	Featuring européen et/ou international (European and/or International featuring)	Nominated	

== See also ==
- List of artists who reached number one in Nigeria
