= Made Kuti =

Nigerian singer and songwriter

- Born: Omorinmade Anikulapo-Kuti; September 26, 1995 (age 30)
- Education: Trinity Laban Conservatoire
- Occupations: Singer; songwriter; multi-instrumentalist; composer; arranger
- Spouse: Inedoye Adanne Kuti (m. 2023)
- Parents: Femi Kuti (father); Funke Kuti (mother)
- Relatives: Funmilayo Ransome-Kuti (great-grandmother); Fela Kuti (grandfather); Seun Kuti (uncle); Yeni Kuti (aunt)
- Family: Ransome-Kuti Family
- Musical career
- Genres: Afrobeat
- Instruments: Vocals; trumpet; saxophone; piano; drums; bass guitar

Ọmọ́rìnmádé Aníkúlápó Kútì (born 26 September 1995) known professionally as Mádé Kuti, is a Nigerian afrobeat multi-instrumentalist, composer/arranger, artist/performer. The son of Femi Kuti and grandson of Afrobeat pioneer Fela Kuti, Mádé was raised in The New Afrika Shrine, surrounded by rhythm, resistance, and live sound.

He picked up the saxophone at age five and joined his father’s Positive Force band as a child—touring globally and performing at venues like Glastonbury and the Hollywood Bowl before the age of ten. Later, he trained at London’s Trinity Laban Conservatoire, where Fela once studied, mastering up to six instruments including saxophone, trumpet, bass, guitar, and Piano.

In 2021, Mádé released his debut album For(e)ward, a modern Afrobeat manifesto addressing issues like corruption, inequality, and police brutality. The album was packaged with his father’s Stop the Hate under the joint title Legacy+, earning the pair a Grammy nomination for Best Global Music Album in 2022. On For(e)ward, Mádé played every instrument himself.

He formed his band, The Movement, that same year and headlined his first solo show at The Shrine on April 4, 2021. In 2024 he performed at Tanzania’s Sauti Za Busara Festival.

Following the release of singles like "Stand Tall and No More Wars", Kuti returned in 2025 with "I Won't Run Away" and "Life As We Know", the first two offerings from his upcoming studio album, Where Does Happiness Come From?, released in July.

== Early life ==
Made Kuti was born to Femi and Funke Kuti on 26 September 1995. He was raised in the New Afrika Shrine. He learned to play multiple musical instruments including the trumpet, alto, sax, piano and drums in his childhood and started playing the trumpet at age 3. After studying music at Uxbridge College, Hayes Campus, he attended Trinity Laban Conservatoire in London which was Fela Kuti's alma mater.

== Career ==
Made Kuti started out his musical career in childhood as he played the bass and saxophone with his fathers band, Positive Force. He started touring with the band at the age of 8. He released his debut single titled "Free Your Mind" in October 2020.

His debut album was titled For(e)ward which was released solo and as part of a double record titled Legacy+ alongside his father, Femi Kuti. The album was produced by Sodi Marciszewer who had worked with Fela Kuti in the past and was released under Partisan Records. Femi Kuti's Stop the Hate occupies the first 10 tracks of the album while Made Kuti's For(e)ward occupies the last 8 tracks. The cover art is a portrait of Femi Kuti and Made Kuti by Delphine Desane. The album was rated 7.7/10 by a Pulse Nigeria reviewer. His music is described as a blend of jazz, highlife, rock, and reggae.

Made Kuti held an event titled "An evening with Made Kuti" at the Terra Kulture Arena in Lagos where he unveiled his band named The Movement.

He is the son of Nigerian afrobeat musician, Femi Kuti and grandson of afrobeat pioneer, Fela Kuti.

== Personal life ==
On 1 November 2023, Made and Inedoye Adanne Onyenso (now addressed as. Inedoye Adanne Anikulapo-Kuti) married in Lagos, Nigeria in a private ceremony held in Ikeja.

== Discography ==
=== Singles ===
Year	Title	Album
2020	"Free Your Mind"	For(e)ward
2020	"Your Enemy"	For(e)ward
2022	Stand Tall	Single Release
2022	No More Wars	Single Release
2025	I Won't Run Away	Chapter 1: Where Does Happiness Come From?
2025	Life As We Know It	Chapter 1: Where Does Happiness Come From?
2025	You Can't Hide	Chapter 1: Where Does Happiness Come From?

=== Albums ===
2021 - For(e)ward

2025- Chapter 1: Where Does Happiness Come From?

== Awards and nominations ==
Year	Award	Category	Work	Result	Ref
2022	Grammy Awards	Best Global Music Album	Legacy+	Nominated	
2022	Afrima	Best Artiste Duo or Group in African Jazz	Free Your Mind	Nominated	
2022	Headies Award	Album of The Year	Legacy+	Nominated	
2022	Headies Award	Best Alternative Song	Free Your Mind	Nominated	
