= Legacy+ =

Studio album by Femi Kuti and Made Kuti
- Released: 5 February 2021
- Genre: Afrobeat
- Length: 88:18
- Label: Partisan Records; PTKF 21892
- Producer: Sodi Marciszewer

Femi Kuti albums chronology
One People One World (2018)	Stop the Hate (2021)

Made Kuti albums chronology
For(e)ward (2021)

Legacy+ is a 2021 double album by Femi Kuti and Made Kuti. The album is made up of Femi Kuti's Stop the Hate and Made Kuti's For(e)ward. It was released on 5 February 2021.

== Background ==
The title represents a tribute to Fela Kuti as the pioneering afrobeat musician and also to the future of afrobeat music in general. It has also been referred to as an immortalisation of Fela Kuti and the afrobeat genre. Femi Kuti's Stop the Hate album occupies the first 10 tracks of the album while Made Kuti's For(e)ward album occupies the last 8 tracks. The cover art is a portrait art of Femi Kuti and Made Kuti by Delphine Desane.

Femi Kuti's 10th studio album, Stop the Hate is described as a sociopolitical recording which proffers solutions to perennial problems highlighted in his previous recordings. He encourages youth participation in politics and urges a quick resolution to problems.

Made Kuti's For(e)ward addresses national unity, sexual harassment as well as issues relating to police brutality and End SARS. He also chronicles how Nigeria's problems have remained the same since the 1970s.

The music video for Femi Kuti's "As We Struggle Everyday" was released on the same day as the album release. The video was filmed by Optimus Dammy, edited by Audrey Hurtis, and illustrated by Kiki Picasso.

== Production and release ==
The album was produced by Sodi Marciszewer who had worked with Fela Kuti in the past and was released under Partisan Records. All the instrumentats on For(e)ward were composed, arranged and played by Made Kuti.

== Tracklist ==
No.	Title	Length
1.	"Pà Pá Pà"	3:22
2.	"As We Struggle Everyday"	4:29
3.	"Stop The Hate"	5:19
4.	"Land Grab"	2:32
5.	"Na Bigmanism Spoil Government"	4:04
6.	"You Can't Fight Corruption With Corruption"	5:19
7.	"Show of Shame"	3:22
8.	"Privatisation"	4:41
9.	"Young Boy/Young Girl"	7:56
10.	"Set Your minds and Souls Free"	6:04
11.	"Free Your Mind"	5;20
12.	"Your Enemy"	4:48
13.	"Blood"	4:06
14.	"Different Streets"	7:42
15.	"Higher You'll Find"	5:03
16.	"Hymn"	2:48
17.	"Young Lady"	7:13
18.	"We Are Strong"	4:05
Total length:		88:18

== Reception ==
Ratings
Review scores
Source	Rating
And It Don't Stop	B+
The Arts Desk	4/5 stars
The Guardian	4/5 stars
Pitchfork	7.8
Pulse Nigeria	7.7/10
The Scotsman	4/5 stars

A reviewer for The Guardian noted that Femi Kuti's Stop the Hate is "an unremarkable continuation of the Afrobeat canon" and serves as a springboard for Made Kuti's For(e)ward. It was then rated 4 stars out of 5. The album was rated 7.7/10 by a Pulse Nigeria reviewer who said "it’s another accomplished show of musicianship - as you would expect from a coalition of the Kutis on a ‘Legacy’ project." A reviewer for The Quietus described the album as afrobeat being adapted for a "western palette".

=== Awards and nominations ===
Year	Award	Category	Recipient	Work	Result	Ref
2022	Grammy Awards	Best Global Music Album	Femi and Made Kuti	Legacy+	Nominated	
2022	Grammy Awards	Best Global Music Performance	Femi Kuti	"Pà Pá Pà"	Nominated	
