= Next Big Sound =

- Company type: Private
- Industry: Music; Internet
- Founded: August 2008
- Headquarters: New York, New York
- Key people: Alex White: CEO
- Products: Online music analytics
- Number of employees: 23
- Website: nextbigsound.com

Next Big Sound (NBS) is a New York–based company which provides analytics for online music. The company analyses the popularity of musicians in social networks, streaming services, and radio. The company was acquired by Pandora in May 2015.

== Business model ==
Next Big Sound allows users to track mentions of bands and musical artists across several music websites, such as Last.fm, MySpace, Facebook, iLike, and Twitter. NBS calculates and graphs each of these statistics over time and compares the data to that of other similar bands. The site has been tracking this data since June 2009, and reports analyzing over 486,000 bands.

== History ==
The business grew from a class assignment at Northwestern University, where founders Samir Rayani (CTO), Alex White (CEO), Jason Sosnovsky (since parted with NBS) and David Hoffman (CPO) attended. As part of the entrepreneur class, students present their ideas to venture capitalists. The Next Big Sound received US$25,000 in seed money. In the summer of 2009, the company was chosen to participate in the TechStars incubator program for online startups in Boulder, Colorado. On June 1, 2012, the company moved its headquarters from Boulder to New York City.

Next Big Sound was named one of the 10 best music startups of 2010 by Billboard Magazine and CEO Alex White was named to Billboard's 30 Under 30 executives to watch list.

On May 25, 2014, the company announced a new division, Next Big Book, and a partnership with Macmillan Publishers. Next Big Sound raised $7.5 million in funding from Foundry Group, IA Ventures and others. On May 19, 2015, Pandora acquired the company.

On October 1, 2021, the company announced in a blog post that the Next Big Sound platform would be shutting down on November 1. However, the team stated that they would be transitioning to working on Pandora's Artist Marketing Platform (AMP), which would continue to share data with partners such as Billboard.
