= Gyakie =

Ghanaian recording artist (born 1998)

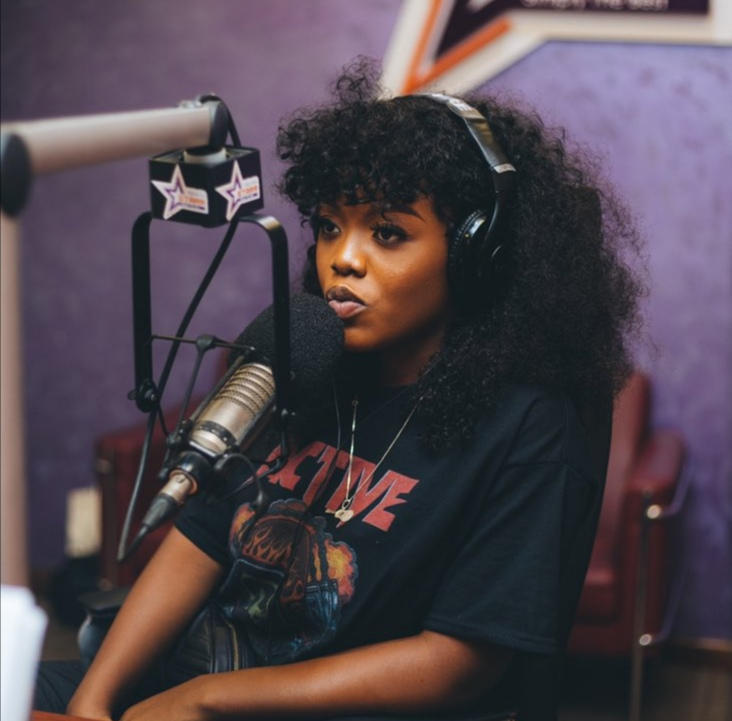
- Gyakie in 2021

Background information
- Also known as: Song Bird
- Born: Jackline Acheampong; 16 December 1999 (age 26); Kumasi, Ghana
- Genres: Afro-fusion, Highlife, Alternative R&B
- Occupation: Musician
- Years active: 2019–present
- Label: Flip The Music

Jackline Acheampong (born 16 December 1999), known professionally as Gyakie, aka Song Bird, is a Ghanaian R&B and afro-fusion singer. In 2019, Gyakie released her debut single, "Love is Pretty", which paved the way for another single, "Never Like This". In August 2020, the "Forever" song from her five-track EP Seed enjoyed airplay and led the charts in Ghana, Kenya and Nigeria. Gyakie's father is Nana Acheampong.

== Early life and education ==
Gyakie was raised in Kumasi in the Ashanti Region of Ghana. She graduated from T.I. Ahmadiyya Senior High School, Kumasi and completed her undergraduate studies at Kwame Nkrumah University of Science and Technology (KNUST), where she majored in International Business.

== Career ==
Gyakie was born into a family of musicians, and by age eight, she had started joining her father in the studio. She was also influenced by Aṣa and Ghanaian musician Omar Sterling of R2Bees.

Gyakie endured pressure at the early stage of her music journey. She told DJ Edu in a BBC Africa interview that she was often in tears when she started commercial music because her management was bent on achieving results.

Gyakie released her first single, "Love Is Pretty", in February 2019, and then released "Never Like This". She released a five-track EP, titled Seed, in August 2020. The "Forever" track on the Seed EP enjoyed airplay in Ghana, Kenya, and Nigeria. It topped music charts such as Billboard's Top Triller Global and Shazam's Top 200 charts. Gyakie released a remix of "Forever" with Nigerian singer Omah Lay in March 2021. That same month, she was named the emerging woman of the year at the 2021 3Music Women's Brunch for the 3Music Awards 2021.

She has signed an international record deal with Sony Music Entertainment, RCA Records UK, and Sony Music Africa.

In March 2022, Gyakie was named the Woman of the Year for the 3Music Awards 2022 during the 3Music Women's brunch.

In June 2022, Gyakie was featured on the Grammys' "Herbal tea and white sofas" interview, a new series where artists reveal their backstage must-haves.

She released her second EP, My Diary, in July 2022. The EP features Nigerian musician Davido. She also released a new single, "December", in April 2024.

Gyakie was named in the Forbes Africa 30 Under 30 class of 2025

Gyakie released her debut Album AfterMidnight on August 29, 2025

Following the completion of her 2021 joint record deal with Sony music west Africa and RCA Records in UK, Gyakie is now fully backed by her record label Flip The Music led by Emmanuel Sedo.

In 2026, her debut album AfterMidnight received a nomination for the rest of Africa Category at the South Africa Music Awards (SAMAs)

Gyakie entered a distribution deal with Warner Music Africa in 2026

== Discography ==
=== Studio albums ===
- After Midnight (2025)

=== Extended plays ===
- Seed (EP) (2020)
- My Diary (EP) (2022)

=== Singles ===
- "Love Is Pretty" (2019)
- "Never Like This" (2019)
- "Sor Mi Mu" ft. Bisa Kdei (2020)
- "Forever Remix" ft. Omah Lay (2021)
- "Vacation"
- "Whine"
- "Follow You" — Fiokee, Chike & Gyakie (2021)
- "Something" (2022)
- "Rent Free" (2023)
- "December" (2024)
- "Sankofa" (2025)
- "Unconditional" (2025)
- “Treasure” (2026)

==== Featured on ====
- "Sheege" — D-Black ft. Gyakie (2021)
- "Right Here" — Blaq Jerzee ft. Gyakie (2021)
- "Like This" — Serge Ibaka, Diplo & Gyakie
- "Paradise" — AKA, Musa Keys & Gyakie (2022)
- "Need Your Love" — R2Bees ft. Gyakie (2022)
- "Scar" — JBee & Gyakie (2023)
- "Sika" — Bisa Kdei ft. Gyakie (2024)
- "Runaway (Omalicha)" — Khaid ft. Gyakie (2024)
- Stranger - Kuami Eugene ft Gyakie (2026)
- Call Me - Ronaldinho ft Mavo & Gyakie (2026)

== Awards and nominations ==
Year	Award	Category	Nominated work	Result	Ref
2021	3Music Awards	Emerging Woman of the Year	Herself	Won	
2021	3Music Awards	Breakthrough Act of the Year	Herself	Nominated	
2021	3Music Awards	EP of the year	SEED EP	Nominated	
2021	Vodafone Ghana Music Awards	Best New Artist	Herself	Nominated	
2021	Vodafone Ghana Music Awards	Best AfroBeats/AfroPop song of the year	Forever	Nominated	
2021	Vodafone Ghana Music Awards	EP of the year	SEED EP	Nominated	
2022	3Music Awards	Woman of the Year	Herself	Won	
2022	3Music Awards	Artiste of the Year	Herself	Nominated	
2022	3Music Awards	Afrobeats/AfroPop Act of the Year	Herself	Nominated	
2022	Vodafone Ghana Music Awards	Album or EP of the Year	SEED EP	Nominated	
2022	Vodafone Ghana Music Awards	International Collaboration of the Year	"Forever (Remix)" ft Omah Lay	Won	
2022	The Headie Awards	Best West African Artiste of the Year	Gyakie	Won	
2024	Ghana Music Awards	International Collaboration of the year	Scar	Nominated	
