= Sarz =

Nigerian record producer and musician

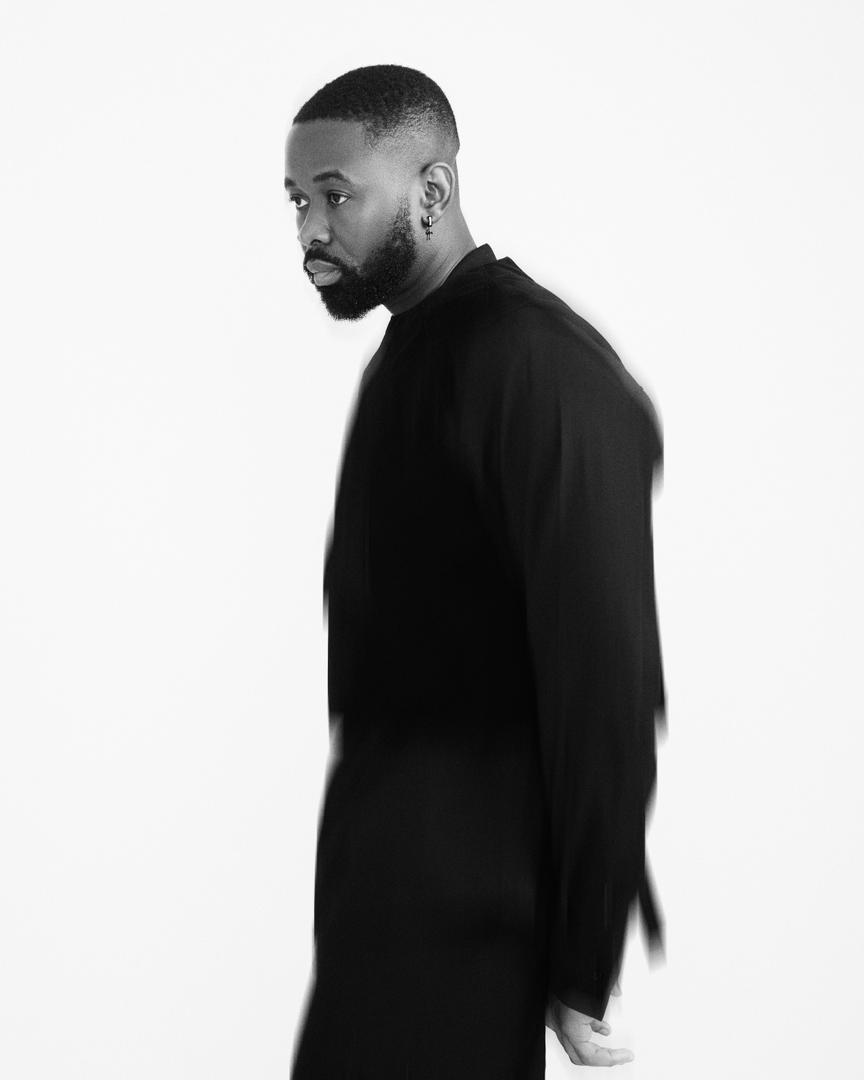

Background information
- Born: Osabuohien Osaretin; 17 March 1989 (age 37); Benin City, Edo State, Nigeria
- Genres: Afrobeats; pop; hip hop; R&B
- Occupations: Record producer, musician
- Instruments: Keyboard; synthesizer; drum; shekere; sampler
- Years active: 2007–present
- Label: 1789 Entertainment

Osabuohien Osaretin (born 17 March 1989), better known by his stage name Sarz, is a Nigerian record producer, mixing engineer and musician. Born in Benin City, Edo State, he is popularly known for the tag "Sarz on the beat" or "Really", at the beginning or end of his music productions.

His first full credit production work was for Lord of Ajasa's "See Drama" in 2007. He has produced tracks for Wizkid, Naeto C, Banky W, Skales, Shank, Reminisce, Goldie Harvey, eLDee, Wande Coal, YQ, Lojay and Niniola. He was formerly signed to Trybe Records, but left the outfit after his contract expired in November 2013.

== Musical career ==
In 2010, Sarz produced the single "Joor Oh" and the remix for Jahbless which featured Durella, Ruggedman, Reminisce, Ice Prince and eLDee. The song won "Best Street Hop" and was nominated for "Best Collaboration" at The Headies 2011. In 2011, he produced Shank's "Salute", eLDee's "Today Today" & "Wash Wash", Skales' "Mukulu", Goldie Harvey's "Don't Touch My Body" and Reminisce's "Kako Bi Chicken". "Kako Bi Chicken" was nominated for "Best Street Hop" at The Headies 2012. Later that year, he solely produced eLDee's Undeniable album (except "We Made It").

At the 2012 Nigeria Entertainment Awards, Sarz was nominated for the "Producer of the Year" award alongside Don Jazzy. Although Don Jazzy won the award, he ended up giving the award to Sarz. Sarz won "Best New Producer" at the 2012 Dynamix Awards. He went on to release his debut solo single "Beat of Life (Samba)" featuring Nigerian artiste, Wizkid, from his reportedly upcoming album.

In 2014, he produced two songs on Wizkid's Ayo album, "Jaiye Jaiye" featuring Femi Kuti and "Kilofe". He was mentioned as one of the five new music producers giving Don Jazzy a run for his money by the Premium Times Nigeria. Sarz was reported to have signed an endorsement deal with Nike later that year. Sarz was the executive producer for the official Hennessy Artistry 2014 theme song "Dance Go (Eau de Vie)", which featured Wizkid and 2Face Idibia.

In April 2020, Sarz and fellow producer Shizzi decided to go live on Instagram for a face-off titled "The Battle of Hits" on 30 March 2020, which attracted a peak of 19.2k live viewers across the world.

In 2021, Sarz released "Monalisa" with Lojay. "Monalisa" was certified Silver by the British Phonographic Industry (BPI) in 2023.

== Awards and nominations ==
Year	Event	Prize	Recipient	Result	Ref
2012	Dynamix Awards	Music Producer of the Year	Himself	Won	
2013	City People Entertainment Awards	Music Producer of the Year	Himself	Won	
2013	Nigeria Entertainment Awards	Music Producer of the Year	Himself	Nominated	
2013	Nigeria Entertainment Awards	Song of the Year	"Beat of Life (Samba)" (featuring Wizkid)	Nominated	
2013	South South Music Awards	Producer of the Year	Himself	Nominated	
2018	The Headies	Producer of the Year	Himself	Nominated	
2019	SoundCity MVP Awards Festival	African Producer of the Year	Himself	Nominated	
2019	All Africa Music Awards	Music Producer of the Year	Himself	Nominated	
2019	All Africa Music Awards	Songwriter of the Year	Sarz & Wurld for "Trobul"	Nominated	
2019	All Africa Music Awards	Best RnB Duo	Sarz & Wurld	Nominated	
2021	Afro X Digital Awards	Music Producer of the Year	Himself	Won	
2021	All Africa Music Awards	Best Artist, Duo or Group in African Contemporary	Sarz & Lojay for "Monalisa"	Nominated	
2022	The Headies	Producer of the Year	Himself	Won	
2022	All Africa Music Awards	African Fans Favourite	"Monalisa" (Remix) (with Lojay featuring Chris Brown)	Nominated	

== Discography ==
Studio albums

- Protect Sarz at All Costs (2025)

EPs

- LV N ATTN (2021)

Compilation albums

- Memories That Last Forever 2 (2023)
