= Away (Ayra Starr song) =

Promotional single by Ayra Starr

from the EP Ayra Starr
- Released: 22 January 2021
- Recorded: At Mavin Studios, Lekki, Lagos, Nigeria
- Genre: R&B; alté
- Length: 2:49
- Label: Mavin
- Songwriters: Oyinkansola Aderibigbe; Oluwadamilare Aderibigbe
- Producer: Louddaaa

Ayra Starr promotional single chronology
"Away" (2021)	"Bad Vibes" (2024)

Music video
- "Away" on YouTube

"Away" is the debut single by Nigerian singer-songwriter Ayra Starr for her eponymous debut EP. It is the first song on the EP, released in January 2021 by Mavin Records. It was written by Ayra Starr and her brother Dami and was produced by Louddaaa.

Characterized as an R&B song with elements of alté, "Away" is about breaking up and moving on from a past lover. The song received mostly positive reviews from music critics and peaked at number four on Nigeria's TurnTable Top 50 chart. Its accompanying music video, directed by Kewa Oni and Seun Opabisi, debuted on MTV Base's Official Naija Top 10. OkayAfrica included the song in their list of The 9 Best Nigerian Songs of January 2021.

== Background and reception ==
After signing a record deal with Mavin Records in 2019, Ayra Starr began working on a debut project. "Away" was one of the songs she co-wrote with her brother Dami, credited as Oluwadamilare Aderibigbe. The production was handled by Louddaaa. Then mixing and mastering was completed by Ikon at Mavin Studios in Lekki, Lagos. Ayra Starr discussed the song's creation during an interview. She said: "I freestyled half of Away at a time I was feeling down. It was like therapy. Singing the song out loud was like freeing myself from my burden." She added that it "is not just a heartbreak song, it's a song that empowers you to stand up to that thing or person that is causing you sadness."

In a review published in Clash magazine in January 2021, Robin Murray described "Away" as "Mellifluous," "potent," and "dynamic," stating that "the vocal touches on R&B while retaining elements of that alté sound." Pulse Nigeria described the song as R&B. NME's Timi Sotire felt that it encapsulated Ayra Starr's "journey through her formative years; growing from being a child who doubted her ability, to a young woman with an unbridled level of confidence." The Native Mag's Tami Makinde described the track as a "mid-tempo and rhythmic anti-love anthem about finding the strength to move on from an undeserving lover."

== Commercial performance ==
During its debut week, "Away" reached number one on iTunes in Nigeria. It also charted at number one on Apple Music in 3 countries including Nigeria, Sierra Leone and Liberia. On 1 February 2021, it debuted at number ten on the TurnTable Top 50 chart and eventually peaked at number four for two consecutive weeks beginning on 22 February 2021. "Away" went on to become Ayra Starr's most popular record with over 1 million Spotify streams as of April 2021. OkayAfrica included the song in their list of The 9 Best Nigerian Songs of January 2021.

== Music video ==
The music video of "Away" was directed by Kewa Oni and Seun Opabisi, both of whom had previously directed music videos for artists like Rema, Johnny Drille, Ladipoe, and Lady Donli. It was choreographed by Elfrida Grey. Released on the same day as the EP, the clip debuted on MTV Base's Official Naija Top 10. As of April 2021, it has surpassed over 3 million views on YouTube, making Ayra Starr the youngest Nigerian female artist to accomplish that. The music video is three minutes long and features scenes inspired by iconic women warriors Joan of Arc and Dahomey Amazons. In it, Ayra Starr is shown assaulting a shirtless man lying on the ground bound in chains (played by fashion model Davou Pwajok). She is dressed from head to toe in a black leather ensemble and has a sword in her right hand. She said of the video, “I wanted to tap into my new-found independence and power. I’m breaking free. I’m a strong warrior, fighting against anything that doesn’t give me peace.”

== Weekly charts ==
Chart (2021)	Peak position
Nigeria TurnTable Top 50	4

== Release history ==
Region	Date	Format	Label	Ref.
Various	22 January 2021	Digital download; streaming	Mavin Records	

== Awards and nominations ==
Year	Award	Category	Result	Ref
2021	Net Honours	Most Played RnB Song	Nominated	
