= Lojay =

Nigerian singer and songwriter

- Born: Lekan Osifeso Junior; 28 April 1996 (age 30)
- Origin: Ogun State
- Genres: Afrobeats; afropop; R&B
- Occupations: Singer; songwriter; producer
- Instrument: Vocals
- Years active: 2016–present
- Label: Koratori Music

Lekan Osifeso Jr. (born 28 April 1996), popularly known as Lojay, is a Nigerian singer, songwriter and producer. He peaked at number 8 on the Billboard U.S. Afrobeats Songs chart with a remix of his song "Monalisa" with Sarz, which features Chris Brown. He received a nomination for the Headies Award for Next Rated artiste at the 2022 Headies Award.

In 2023, Lojay alongside Nigerian singer Davido were featured on the song "Sensational" by Chris Brown. The song debuted at number 71 on the Billboard Hot 100, serving as Davido and Lojay's first entry on the chart. The song earned him his first career nomination at the Grammy Awards, receiving a nomination in the Best African Music Performance category.

== Early life and background ==
Lekan Osifeso Jnr was born and raised Lagos, he lived in Ikorodu and later moved to Victoria Island with his family. He graduated from the University of Portsmouth, UK in 2018. Lekan has shown great potential and inclination towards music since he was a child. While in secondary school at Nigerian Turkish Secondary School in Nigeria, he was in a local rap group called Dkoy. While in Dkoy he released hits like Kilode. As his mother was a pastor, Osifeso went to church regularly, as a family routine during his formative years. While growing up, Chris Brown was one of his favorite singers.

== Career ==
Lojay's stage name is an abbreviation of the first letters of his full name "Lekan Osifeso Junior" (LO-J). He picked interest in music and singing as an adolescent. And pursued his passion through his teenage years. He is fluid with the genre of music he does and switches from one gnere to the other. In an interview with Nataal, he said

"I don't have a genre and I'm not going to put myself in a box just because people expect it....anyone that wants to put me in a box is free to do so. As long as you are jamming and connecting to the gbedu(song), you can call it anything you want. If I do rock tomorrow, nobody should fight me."

He started music professionally in 2016 on a part-time basis while he was still an undergraduate and then went on to focus solely on music after obtaining his degree. In December 2017, Lojay released his debut EP, Midnight Vibes, which consisted of five tracks. The titles of the tracks from the EP are "Atarodo", "Alomo", "Kele", "10K Splaw" and "Whine & Bubble".

In 2019, he released the single "Ariel" and in 2020 he released another single titled "Ogogoro". Between his initial sojourn into the music industry in 2016 and the release of his breakout songs in 2021, Lojay dropped several singles including "Along, Kuli Kuli, Over the Bar" amongst others.

On 4 June 2021, his sophomore EP titled LV N ATTN (stylized from Love and Attention), which was a joint EP alongside producer Sarz, was released. LV N ATTN is a five track EP that contained his breakout single "Tonongo", the song "Monalisa", which he went on to remix with Chris Brown,"LV N ATTN", in which he featured Wizkid, "Panty!" and "Park O X3". The body of work earned a nomination for The Headies Award for Next Rated artist for The Headies 2022. In November 2021, he and Zlatan Ibile were featured by DJ Neptune on the song titled "Only Fan".

In 2022, he took part in the Heineken UEFA Champions League trophy tour in Nigeria.

In March 2023, Lojay released his second solo EP titled Gangster Romantic. "Monalisa" was certified Silver by the British Phonographic Industry (BPI) later that month.

== Discography ==
=== Studio albums ===
List of studio albums, showing selected details, chart positions and certifications
Title	Details	Charts Peak	
Title	Details	NGR	SA
XOXO	•Released:10 October 2025 •Guest Appearance :Tyla, Odeal, Victony	35	97

=== EPs ===
Year	Work Title	Notes	Ref
2017	Midnight Vibes	Debut EP	
2021	LV N ATTN	Collaborative EP with Sarz	
2023	Gangster Romantic	7-track EP featuring DJ Maphorisa and Kabza De Small	

=== Singles ===
==== As lead artist ====
List of charted singles as lead artist
Title	Year	Peak chart positions				Album
Title	Year	NGR	UK	NZ Hot	US Afro	Album
"Monalisa (Remix)" (with Sarz featuring Chris Brown)	2022	7	99	30	8	Non-album single
"Memories" (featuring Tyla)	2025	93	—	—	—	XOXO

==== As featured artist ====
List of charted singles as featured artist
Title	Year	Peak chart positions							Certification	Album
Title	Year	NGR	NLD Tip	NZ Hot	SA	SUR	UK	US	Certification	Album
"Sensational" (Chris Brown featuring Davido and Lojay)	2023	12	7	7	17	4	45	71	RMNZ: Gold	11:11

=== Other certified songs ===
List of other certified songs, showing album and release year
Title	Year	Certification	Album
"Monalisa" (with Sarz)	2021	BPI: Gold; RMNZ: Gold	LV N ATTN

== Awards and nominations ==
Year	Award ceremony	Prize	Recipient/Nominated work	Result
2022	The Headies	The Headies Award for Next Rated	Himself	Nominated
2022	The Headies	Best Afrobeats Single of the Year	"Monalisa" – Lojay & Sarz	Nominated
2022	The Headies	Headies' Viewer's Choice	"Monalisa" – Lojay & Sarz	Nominated
2022	The Headies	Best Afrobeats Single of the Year	"Monalisa" – Lojay & Sarz	Nominated
