= Ayra Starr discography =

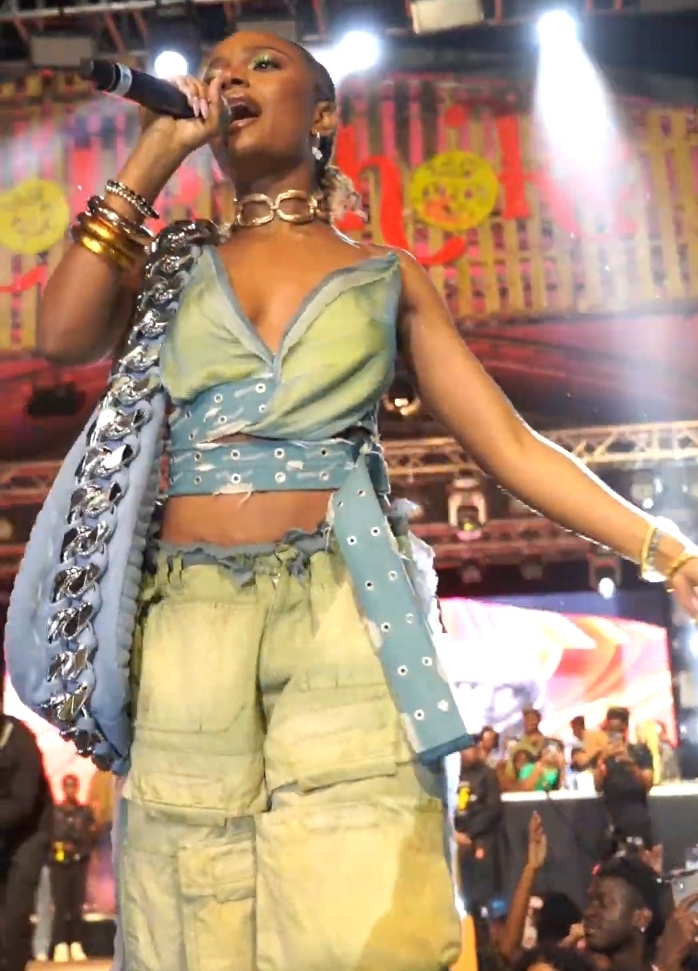
- Studio albums: 3
- EPs: 1
- Singles: 29
- Promotional single: 3

The discography of Nigerian singer and songwriter Ayra Starr includes 3 studio albums, 1 EP, 28 singles (17 as lead artist) with 5 promotional singles and 4 guest appearances.

== Studio albums ==
List of studio albums, with selected details
Title	Album details	Peak chart positions				
Title	Album details	NGR	CAN	FRA	UK	US
19 & Dangerous	Released: 6 August 2021; Label: Mavin; Formats: Digital download, streaming	7	—	—	—	—
The Year I Turned 21	Released: 31 May 2024; Label: Mavin, Republic; Formats: CD, digital download, streaming	1	89	72	80	195
Starr Girl	Released: 14 August 2026; Label: Mavin, Republic; Format: CD, digital download, LP, streaming	2	—	100	—	—

== Extended plays ==
List of extended plays, with selected details
Title	EP details
Ayra Starr	Released: 22 January 2021; Label: Mavin; Formats: Digital download, streaming

== Singles ==
=== As lead artist ===
List of charting singles, with selected chart positions, showing year released and album name
Title	Year	Peak chart positions										Certifications	Album
Title	Year	NGR	CAN	FRA	IRE	NLD	SUR	SWE	SWI	UK	WW	Certifications	Album
"Fashion Killa"	2021	18	—	—	—	—	—	—	—	— (Note: "Fashion Killa" did not enter the UK Singles Chart, but peaked at number eighteen on the UK Afrobeat Singles Chart.)	—	TCSN: Silver	19 & Dangerous
"Away"	2021	4	—	—	—	—	—	—	—	—	—	TCSN: Silver	19 & Dangerous
"Bloody Samaritan" (solo or remix featuring Kelly Rowland)	2021	1	—	—	—	—	34	—	—	— (Note: "Bloody Samaritan (Remix)" did not enter the UK Singles Chart, but the Original Version peaked at number four on the UK Afrobeat Singles Chart.)	—	TCSN: 2× Platinum; BPI: Silver	19 & Dangerous
"Rush"	2022	1	63	5	56	17	1	56	18	24	115	TCSN: 3× Platinum; BPI: Platinum; MC: Platinum; SNEP: Diamond	19 & Dangerous
"Sability"	2023	1	—	—	—	—	6	—	—	— (Note: "Sability" did not enter the UK Singles Chart, but peaked at number five on the UK Afrobeat Singles Chart.)	—	TCSN: Platinum	Non-album singles
"Stamina" (with Tiwa Savage and Young Jonn)	2023	3	—	—	—	—	—	—	—	— (Note: "Stamina" did not enter the UK Singles Chart, but peaked at number two on the UK Afrobeat Singles Chart.)	—	TCSN: Platinum	Non-album singles
"Rhythm & Blues"	2023	12	—	—	—	—	—	—	—	— (Note: "Rhythm & Blues" did not enter the UK Singles Chart, but peaked at number eight on the UK Afrobeat Singles Chart.)	—	TCSN: Gold	The Year I Turned 21
"Commas"	2024	2	—	—	—	83	5	—	—	— (Note: "Commas" did not enter the UK Singles Chart, but peaked at number one on the UK Afrobeat Singles Chart.)	—	TCSN: 2× Platinum; SNEP: Gold	The Year I Turned 21
"Santa" (with Rvssian and Rauw Alejandro)	2024	—	—	—	—	—	—	—	38	—	24	PROMUSICAE: 5× Platinum	The Year I Turned 21
"Pinacolada" (with Thisizlondon and 6lack)	2024	—	—	—	—	—	—	—	—	—	—		Non-album singles
"All the Love"	2025	10	—	—	—	—	12	—	—	—	—		Non-album singles
"Gimme Dat" (with Wizkid)	2025	3	—	—	—	—	6	—	—	—	—		Starr Girl
"Hot Body"	2025	3	—	—	—	—	—	—	—	—	—		Starr Girl
"Who's Dat Girl" (featuring Rema)	2025	2	—	—	—	—	—	—	—	—	—		Starr Girl
"Where Do We Go"	2026	10	—	—	—	—	—	—	—	—	—		Starr Girl
"Tornado"	2026	9	—	—	—	—	—	—	—	—	—		Starr Girl
"Treat U Right" (with Fola)	2026	1	—	—	—	—	—	—	—	—	—		Non-album single
"Heaven Baby" (featuring Zayn)	2026	2	—	—	—	—	1	—	—	—	—		Starr Girl
"All the People" (with Shimza and Alok)	2026	—	—	—	—	—	—	—	—	—	—		
"—" denotes items which were not released in that country or failed to chart.

=== As featured artist ===
List of singles as featured artist, with selected chart positions
Title	Year	Peak chart positions									Certifications	Album
Title	Year	NGR	BUL Air.	FRA	NZ Hot	ZAF Stream.	SUR	UK	UK Afro.	US Afro.	Certifications	Album
"2 Sugar" (Wizkid featuring Ayra Starr)	2022	5	—	—	38	70	—	70	—	—	TCSN: Platinum	More Love, Less Ego
"No Love" (Ninho featuring Ayra Starr)	2023	—	—	7	—	—	—	—	—	—	SNEP: Diamond; IFPI: Gold	NI
"Girl Next Door" (Tyla featuring Ayra Starr)	2023	—	—	—	—	—	—	—	—	35		Non-album singles
"My Love" (Leigh-Anne featuring Ayra Starr)	2023	64	—	—	—	—	5	28	—	32		Non-album singles
"You're Hired" (Neiked featuring Ayra Starr)	2023	—	—	—	—	—	21	—	—	—		Non-album singles
"Big FU" (David Guetta featuring Ayra Starr and Lil Durk)	2023	—	—	—	18	—	—	—	—	—		Non-album singles
"Hypé" (Aya Nakamura featuring Ayra Starr)	2024	—	—	7	—	—	—	—	17	—	SNEP: Diamond	Non-album singles
"Good Feelings" (Coldplay and Ayra Starr)	2024	—	—	—	—	—	17	—	—	—		Moon Music
"Bora Bora" (AP Dhillon featuring Ayra Starr)	2024	—	—	—	—	—	3	—	—	—		Non-album single
"Mon bébé" (RnBoi featuring Ayra Starr)	2026	—	—	—	—	—	—	—	—	—		My Eyes Only – Flashback
"Aye Kan (Are You Coming Back)" (Angélique Kidjo featuring Ayra Starr)	2026	33	—	—	—	—	—	—	—	—		Non-album single
"Colorado" (Johnny Drille featuring Ayra Starr and Young John	2026	5	—	—	—	—	—	—	10	24		Before the Morning Light
"Wo, Man" (Peggy Gou featuring Ayra Starr)	2026	—	1	—	—	—	—	—	—	—		Non-album single
"—" denotes items which were not released in that country or failed to chart.

=== Promotional singles ===
List of other charted songs, with selected chart positions
Title	Year	Peak chart positions				Album
Title	Year	NGR	NZ Hot	US Afro.	UK Afro.	Album
"Away"	2021	—	—	—	—	Ayra Starr
"Bad Vibes" (with Seyi Vibez)	2024	2	—	9	6	The Year I Turned 21
"Last Heartbreak Song" (with Giveon)	2024	14	36	6	3	The Year I Turned 21

== Other charted songs ==
List of other charted songs, with selected chart positions
Title	Year	Peak chart positions			Album
Title	Year	NGR	NZ Hot	UK Afro	Album
"Goodbye (Warm Up)" (with Asake)	2024	9	—	11	The Year I Turned 21
"Jazzy's Song"	2024	24	—	—	The Year I Turned 21
"Show Me" (with Latto)	2026	52	—	—	Official FIFA World Cup 2026 Album
"Amazing" (featuring Kwn)	2026	70	—	10	Starr Girl
"Dangerous"	2026	31	—	—	Starr Girl
"Treasure"	2026	38	—	—	Starr Girl
"Ms Paper" (featuring Theodora)	2026	66	—	—	Starr Girl
"Misunderstood"	2026	86	—	—	Starr Girl
"Midnight In New York"	2026	95	—	—	Starr Girl

== Guest appearances ==
List of non-single guest appearances, with other performing artists, showing year released and album name
Title	Year	Other artist(s)	Album
"In the Light"	2021	Johnny Drille	Before We Fall Asleep
"Dangerous"	2021	Cheque	Bravo
"Roadside" (+234 Remix)	2021	Mahalia, Rema	—N/a
"Unbelievable"	2023	Tori Kelly	Tori
