= List of songs recorded by Ayra Starr =

Nigerian singer and songwriter Ayra Starr has recorded songs for her studio albums, extended plays, singles, and collaborations with other artists. Her recorded works include songs from herself-titled debut EP, 19 & Dangerous, and The Year I Turned 21, as well as songs on which she appears as a featured artist.

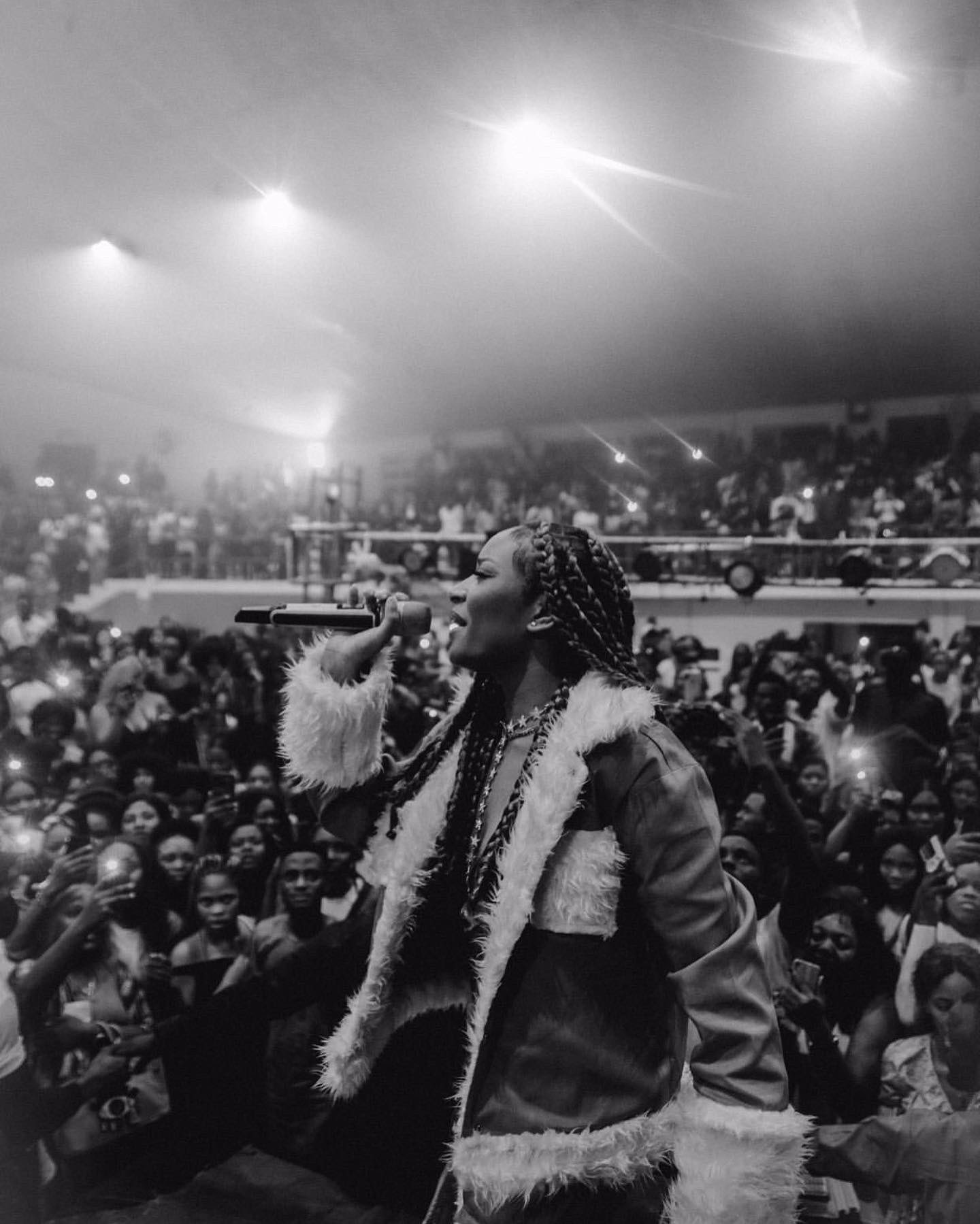
Ayra Starr performing before a crowd at the Miss UNIBEN grand finale in 2021

== Songs ==
Key
| † | Indicates single release |

| Song | Artist(s) | Writer(s) | Album/EP/Single(s) | Year | Ref. |
|---|---|---|---|---|---|
| "1942" | Ayra Starr featuring Milar | Oyinkansola Sarah Aderibigbe; Oluwadamilare Aderibigbe; John Ighodaro | The Year I Turned 21 | 2024 | |
| "21" | Ayra Starr | Mike Hector; Oyinkansola Sarah Aderibigbe; Mason Tanner; Adeyinka Bankole; Tomi Mannonen | The Year I Turned 21 | 2024 | |
| "2 Sugar" | Wizkid featuring Ayra Starr | Richard Isong; Ayodeji Ibrahim Balogun; Oyinkansola Sarah Aderibigbe | More Love, Less Ego | 2022 | |
| All The Love | Ayra Starr | Prince Omoferi; Dada Femi Ayoola; John Ighodaro; Oyinkansola Sarah Aderibigbe | TBD | 2025 | |
| "Amin" | Ayra Starr | Oyinkansola Sarah Aderibigbe | 19 & Dangerous | 2021 | |
| "Ase" | Ayra Starr | Oyinkansola Sarah Aderibigbe | 19 & Dangerous (Deluxe) | 2021 | |
| "Away" † | Ayra Starr | Oyinkansola Sarah Aderibigbe; Oluwadamilare Aderibigbe | Ayra Starr (EP) | 2021 | |
| "Aye Kan (Are You Coming Back)" | Angelique Kidjo featuring Ayra Starr | Angélique Kidjo; Oyinkansola Sarah Aderibigbe | Hope!! | 2026 | |
| "Bad Vibes" | Ayra Starr featuring Seyi Vibez | Oyinkansola Sarah Aderibigbe; Balogun Afolabi Oluwaloseyi; Ajayi Olusegun Michael; Mason Tanner | The Year I Turned 21 | 2024 | |
| "Beggie Beggie" | Ayra Starr and CKay | Oyinkansola Sarah Aderibigbe; Chukwuka Ekweani; Oluwadamilare Aderibigbe | 19 & Dangerous | 2021 | |
| "Big FU" † | David Guetta, Ayra Starr and Lil Durk | Anthony Clemons Jr; David Guetta; Durk Banks; Johnny Goldstein; Theron Thomas | Non-album single | 2023 | |
| "Birds Sing of Money" | Ayra Starr | Oyinkansola Sarah Aderibigbe; Mason Tanner; Michael Ovie Hunter; Marvellous Cosmas | The Year I Turned 21 | 2024 | |
| "Bloody Samaritan" † | Ayra Starr | Oluwadamilare Aderibigbe; Prince Omoferi; Oyinkansola Sarah Aderibigbe | 19 & Dangerous | 2021 | |
| "Bloody Samaritan (Remix)" | Ayra Starr and Kelly Rowland | Kelendria Trene Rowland; Loud Urban Choir; Oluwadamilare David Aderibigbe; Oyinkansola Sarah Aderibigbe; Prince Omoferi; Michael Ovie Hunter; Ryan Ashley; Uzoechi Emenike | 19 & Dangerous (Deluxe) | 2022 | |
| "Bora Bora" | AP Dhillon featuring Ayra Starr | AP Dhillon; Satinderpal Singh; Joseph Watchorn; Anas Rahmoune; Mason Tanner | The Brownprint | 2024 | |
| "Bridgertn" | Ayra Starr | Oyinkansola Sarah Aderibigbe; Oluwadamilare Aderibigbe; Prince Omoferi | 19 & Dangerous | 2021 | |
| "Brought the Family" | Ayra Starr, Jon Bellion | Unknown | Goat: Original Motion Picture Soundtrack | 2026 | |
| "Call" † | Iyanya featuring Ayra Starr | Iyanya Onoyom Mbuk; Oyinkansola Sarah Aderibigbe | Non-album single | 2022 | |
| "Cast (Gen Z Anthem)" | Ayra Starr | Oyinkansola Sarah Aderibigbe; Prince Omoferi; Oluwadamilare Aderibigbe | 19 & Dangerous | 2021 | |
| "Comforter" † | ElGrandeToto featuring Ayra Starr | Taha Fahssi; Oyinkansola Sarah Aderibigbe | Non-album single | 2022 | |
| "Commas" † | Ayra Starr | Oyinkansola Sarah Aderibigbe; Prince Omoferi; Michael Ovie Hunter; Ikechukwu Clinton Nnaemeka | The Year I Turned 21 | 2024 | |
| "Colorado" † | Johnny Drille, Ayra Starr and Young John | Ayoola Johnson; John Ighodaro; Oyinkansola Sarah Aderibigbe; John Saviours Udomboso; Prince Omoferi | Non-album single | 2026 | |
| "Control" | Ayra Starr | Oyinkansola Sarah Aderibigbe; Mason Tanner; Emmanuel Isong; Michael Ovie Hunter | The Year I Turned 21 | 2024 | |
| "DITR" | Ayra Starr | Oyinkansola Sarah Aderibigbe; Oluwadamilare Aderibigbe | Ayra Starr (EP) | 2021 | |
| "Escaladizzy II" | Mavo, Shallipopi, Zlatan and Ayra Starr | Oseremen Marvin; Crown Uzama; Omoniyi Temidayo Raphael; Oyinkansola Sarah Aderibigbe; Promise Ekpe | Kilometer II | 2025 | |
| "Fashion Killer" † | Ayra Starr | Michael Ovie Hunter; Oluwadamilare Aderibigbe; Oluwademilade Alabi; Oyinkansola Sarah Aderibigbe; Tomi Manonnen | 19 & Dangerous | 2021 | |
| "Gara" | Tiwa Savage featuring Ayra Starr | Oyinkansola Sarah Aderibigbe; Prince Maxwell Omoferi; Segun Michael Ajayi; Tiwatope Omolara Savage | Water & Garri (Original Motion Picture Soundtrack) | 2024 | |
| "Gimme Dat | Ayra Starr featuring Wizkid | Adekunle Emmanuel Oluwaseyi; Aniekeme Gabriel Akpan; Ayodeji Ibrahim Balogun; Edafe Gabriel; Elvis Chimezie Akujobi; Fred Daniels; Jerry "Wonda" Duplessis; Katia Cadet; Mary Brown; Olushola Samson Mayowa; Oyinkansola Sarah Aderibigbe; Richard Igebina Imaekhai; Wyclef Jean | Starr Girl | 2025 | |
| "Goodbye (Warm Up)" | Ayra Starr featuring Asake | Oyinkansola Sarah Aderibigbe; Ololade Ahmed; Douglas Ford; Richard Mbu Isong | The Year I Turned 21 | 2024 | |
| "Good Feelings" | Coldplay featuring Ayra Starr | Oyinkansola Sarah Aderibigbe; Guy Berryman; Jonny Buckland; Will Champion; Chris Martin; Alex Pall; Nile Rodgers; Andrew Taggart | Moon Music | 2024 | |
| "Hot Body" † | Ayra Starr | Keven Wolfsohn; Paul Bogumil Goller; Ikechukwu Clinton Nnaemeka; Oyinkansola Sarah Aderibigbe; Promise Ekpe | Starr Girl | 2025 | |
| "How Many Times" † | DJ Big N Ayra Starr; Oxlade | Nonson Temisan Ajufo; Ikuforiji Olaitan; Oyinkansola Sarah Aderibigbe; Alexander Uwaifo | Non-album single | 2023 | |
| "Hypé" † | Aya Nakamura featuring Ayra Starr | Amanda Ibanez; Aya Coco Danioko; Oyinkansola Sarah Aderibigbe | Non-album single | 2024 | |
| "Ija" | Ayra Starr | Oyinkansola Sarah Aderibigbe; Oluwadamilare Aderibigbe; Michael Collins Ajereh | Ayra Starr (EP) | 2021 | |
| "In Between" | Ayra Starr | Oyinkansola Sarah Aderibigbe; Kehinde Alabi | 19 & Dangerous | 2021 | |
| "Jazzy's Song" | Ayra Starr | Oyinkansola Sarah Aderibigbe; Promise Ekpe; Nwamu Francis Chukwudubem; Oluwadamilare Aderibigbe; Michael Collins Ajereh; Oredope Peace | The Year I Turned 21 | 2024 | |
| "Karma" | Ayra Starr | Oyinkansola Sarah Aderibigbe; Michael Collins Ajereh; Oluwadamilare Aderibigbe | 19 & Dangerous | 2021 | |
| "Lagos Love Story" | Ayra Starr | Oyinkansola Sarah Aderibigbe; Michael Ovie Hunter; Godwin Stephen Ufot; Jay Keyz; Matti Haataja; Simo Haataja | The Year I Turned 21 | 2024 | |
| "Last Heartbreak Song" † | Ayra Starr featuring Giveon | Oyinkansola Sarah Aderibigbe; Prince Omoferi; Kehinde Alabi; Giveon Evans; Oluwadamilare Aderibigbe | The Year I Turned 21 | 2024 | |
| "Le Show" | Ayra Starr; Davido; French Montana | David Adedeji Adeleke; Karim Kharbouch; Adil Khayat; Nadir Khayat; Mehdi Bouamer; Dawda | Allah Al Watan Al Malik | 2025 | |
| "Lonely" | Ayra Starr | Oyinkansola Sarah Aderibigbe; Oluwadamilare Aderibigbe | 19 & Dangerous | 2021 | |
| "Lonely Refix" | Ayra Starr and Zinoleesky | Oyinkansola Sarah Aderibigbe; Oniyide Azeez; Oluwadamilare Aderibigbe | 19 & Dangerous (Deluxe) | 2022 | |
| "Love Don't Cost a Dime (Re-Up)" † | Magixx and Ayra Starr | Prince Omoferi; Alexander Adewunmi Adelabu; Oyinkansola Sarah Aderibigbe | Non-album single | 2022 | |
| "Make It Up To You" † | Khalid featuring Ayra Starr | Denis Kosiak; Jason Kellner; Jef Villaluna; Khalid Robinson; Onyenucheya Uzoma Samuel; Oyinkansola Sarah Aderibigbe | Non-album single | 2024 | |
| "Memories" | Ayra Starr | Oyinkansola Sarah Aderibigbe; Oluwadamilare Aderibigbe; Michael Collins Ajereh | Ayra Starr (EP) | 2021 | |
| "Mon Bébé - Remix" | RnBoi, Ayra Starr | Samy Schmitt Fahli; Sarah Oyinkansola Aderibigbe | Non-album single | 2026 | |
| "My Baby" † | Bien featuring Ayra Starr | Bien-Aimé Baraza; Oyinkansola Sarah Aderibigbe; Tatenda Terence Kamera | Alusa Why Are You Topless? | 2023 | |
| "My Love" † | Leigh-Anne Pinnock featuring Ayra Starr | Alex Goldblatt; Oyinkansola Sarah Aderibigbe; Dayo Olatunji; James Anderson; Jireel Lavia Pereira; Kameron Glasper; Kareem Olasunkanmi Temitayo; Khristopher Riddick-Tynes; Leigh-Anne Pinnock; Prince Omoferi; Ras Kassa Alexander | Non-album single | 2023 | |
| "Ngozi" | Crayon & Ayra Starr | Chibueze Charles Chukwu; Prince Oghenemine Omoferi; Oyinkansola Sarah Aderibigbe; Promise Ekpe; Jacob Hunter; Osabuohien Osaretin | Trench to Triumph | 2023 | |
| "No Love" | Ninho, Ayra Starr | Oyinkansola Sarah Aderibigbe; William Nzobazola; Nwamu Francis Chukwudubem | NI | 2023 | |
| "Ogogoro" | Dreamville, Bas and Ayra Starr | Abbas Hamad; Jarrett Goodly; Udoma Peter Kelvin Amba; Richard Park3r Wiggins; Oyinkansola Sarah Aderibigbe | Creed III | 2023 | |
| "On A Low" | Elestee featuring Ayra Starr | Treasure Apiafi Banigo; Oyinkansola Sarah Aderibigbe | Mentally, I'm Here | 2025 | |
| "Orun" | Ayra Starr | Oyinkansola Sarah Aderibigbe; Prince Omoferi; Kehinde Alabi; Godwin Ufot | The Year I Turned 21 | 2024 | |
| "People" | Libianca featuring Ayra Starr and Omah Lay | Libianca Kenzonkinboum Fonji; Orhue Moses Odia; Oyinkansola Sarah Aderibigbe; Stanley Omah Didia | People (Remixes) | 2023 | |
| "Pinacolada" | Thisizlondon, Ayra Starr, 6lack | Michael Hunter; Oyinkansola Sarah Aderibigbe; Ricardo Valentine; Mbryo; Adeyinka "fwdslxsh" Bankole; Alistar "AOD" O'Donnell | non-album single | 2024 | |
| "Rhythm & Blues" † | Ayra Starr | Oyinkansola Sarah Aderibigbe; Uzoma Samuel Onyenucheya; Ayomikun Aro | The Year I Turned 21 | 2024 | |
| "Running" | Ayra Starr and Lojay | Oyinkansola Sarah Aderibigbe; Lekan Osifeso Jr. | 19 & Dangerous (Deluxe) | 2022 | |
| "Rush" † | Ayra Starr | Oyinkansola Sarah Aderibigbe; Prince Omoferi; Alexander Uwaifo; Henri Velasco | 19 & Dangerous (Deluxe) | 2022 | |
| "Sability" † | Ayra Starr | Louddaaa; Michael Ovie Hunter; Prince Omoferi; Awilo Longomba; Oluwadamilare Aderibigbe; Oyinkansola Sarah Aderibigbe; Oluwadamilare Aderibigbe | Non-album single | 2023 | |
| "Santa" † | Rvssian, Rauw Alejandro and Ayra Starr | Raúl Alejandro Ocasio Ruiz; Kilian Johnston; Richard McClashie; Nathalia Marshall; Kevin Thomas; Oswaldo Rangel; Oyinkansola Sarah Aderibigbe; Lucas Sikidila; Nwamu Francis Chukwudubem; Oluwadamilare Aderibigbe; Jorge Pizarro | The Year I Turned 21 | 2024 | |
| "Sare" | Ayra Starr | Oyinkansola Sarah Aderibigbe; Michael Collins Ajereh | Ayra Starr (EP) | 2021 | |
| "Show Me" | Ayra Starr, Latto | Oyinkansola Sarah Aderibigbe; Alyssa Michelle Stephens; Olufeyikemi O Osuntokun; Frank Brim; Joel Castillo; Prince Omoferi | FIFA World Cup 2026 Album | 2026 | |
| "Skinny Girl Anthem" | Ayra Starr and Kayykilo | Oyinkansola Sarah Aderibigbe; Ladipo Eso; Kiara Celestine | 19 & Dangerous (Deluxe) | 2022 | |
| "Snitch" | Ayra Starr and Fousheé | Oyinkansola Sarah Aderibigbe; Brittany Fousheé; Oluwadamilare Aderibigbe | 19 & Dangerous | 2021 | |
| "Stamina" † | Tiwa Savage, Ayra Starr and Young John | Tiwatope Omolara Savage; Oyinkansola Sarah Aderibigbe; John Saviours Udomboso; Prince Omoferi | Non-album single | 2023 | |
| "The Kids Are Alright" | Ayra Starr | Oyinkansola Sarah Aderibigbe; Remy Jones | The Year I Turned 21 | 2024 | |
| "Tornado" † | Ayra Starr | Ephrem Lopez Jr. Kofi Amponsah; Donel Mangena; Afolarin Temiloluwa Odunlami; Oluwaseyi Akerele | Starr Girl | 2026 | |
| "Toxic" | Ayra Starr | Oyinkansola Sarah Aderibigbe; Michael Collins Ajereh; Oluwadamilare Aderibigbe | 19 & Dangerous | 2021 | |
| "Treat U Right" † | Fola featuring Ayra Starr | Afolarin Temiloluwa Odunlami; Oyinkansola Sarah Aderibigbe; Prince Omoferi | TBD | 2026 | |
| "Where Do We Go" † | Ayra Starr | Oyinkansola Sarah Aderibigbe; Ilya Salmanzadeh; Amanda Ibanez; Mason Tanner; Malika Hamza | Starr Girl | 2026 | |
| "Who's Dat Girl" † | Ayra Starr and Rema | Divine Ikubor; Nilusi Nissanka; Nwanu Francis Chukwudubem; Osamudiamen Edward Ekunwe; Oyinkansola Aderibigbe; Promise Ekpe | Starr Girl | 2025 | |
| "Wo, man" † | Peggy Gou featuring Ayra Starr | Peggy Gou; Adrian Hackshaw; Donel Mangena; Kofi Amponsah; Maty Noyes; Michael Go; Oyinkansola Sarah Aderibigbe | TBD | 2026 | |
| "Woman Commando" | Ayra Starr featuring Anitta and Coco Jones | Oyinkansola Sarah Aderibigbe; Nwamu Francis Chukwudubem; Larissa de Macedo Machado; Courtney Jones; Andy Bauza; Ikechukwu Nnaemeka | The Year I Turned 21 | 2024 | |
| "You're Hired" † | Neiked featuring Ayra Starr | Von Mentzer; Rachel Keen; Anton Göransson; Isabella Sjostrand; Michael Foster; Charles Anderson | Non-album single | 2023 | |
