= Ayra Starr videography =

Ayra Starr performs Rush at Shoke Shoke Festival at the KICC, Nairobi.

Nigerian singer and songwriter Ayra Starr has appeared in over forty music videos, including as a lead artist, featured performer, and in ensemble collaborations. She has also released several official performance videos and made appearances in film and television. Starr made her screen debut in 2019 as the love interest in Eri Ife's music video for "Dear Future Wife," prior to launching her music career with Mavin Records. She began her solo visual discography in 2021 with music videos for her breakout single "Away" and follow-ups "Sare" and "DITR" from her debut EP. That same year, she co-directed the music video for "Bloody Samaritan", the lead single from her debut studio album 19 & Dangerous (2021), which became the first solo number-one hit by a female artist on Nigeria's TurnTable Top 50.

The deluxe edition of 19 & Dangerous included the single ""Rush", which received international attention. It's music video surpassed 100 million views on YouTube and contributed to Starr's first Grammy nomination for Best African Music Performance. In 2023, she released the single "Sability" and continued her visual output with high-production videos from her second studio album The Year I Turned 21 (2024), including "Last Heartbreak Song", "Goodbye (Warm Up)", and "Bad Vibes". Starr has also issued official performance videos for several tracks, including "Commas", "Control" and "21."

Starr has also appeared on television and in films. She made her U.S. television debut on The Tonight Show Starring Jimmy Fallon in July 2024, performing a medley of "Last Heartbreak Song" and "Woman Commando". Furthermore, she starred as herself in the Prime Video romantic comedy Christmas in Lagos, in a cameo alongside Adekunle Gold and Wurld. In 2025, she was cast in Children of Blood and Bone, a fantasy film adaptation produced by Lucasfilm and Paramount Pictures, and directed by Gina Prince-Bythewood. The film is scheduled for theatrical release in 2027 and is her first major scripted film role.

== Music videos ==
=== As lead artist ===
Key
†	Denotes music videos directed by Ayra Starr

List of music videos as lead artist, showing year released and director
Title	Year	Other performer(s) credited	Director(s)	Ref.
"Away"	2021	None	Kewa Oni; Seun Opabisi	
"DITR"	2021	None	Afolabi Olalekan	
"Sare"	2021	None	Afolabi Olalekan	
"Bloody Samaritan" †	2021	None	Ayra Starr; Loup Garou	
"Beggie Beggie"	2022	CKay	Director K	
"Rush"	2022	None	TG Omori	
"Sability"	2023	None	Earthboi	
"Rhythm & Blues"	2023	None	Earthboi	
"Bad Vibes"	2024	Seyi Vibez	Bushboy Machiavelli	
"Last Heartbreak Song"	2024	Giveon	Bobby Hanaford	
"Goodbye (Warm Up)"	2024	Asake	Annie Bercy	
"All The Love"	2025	None	Ella Ezeike	
"Gimme Dat" †	2025	Wizkid	Annie Bercy; Ayra Starr	
"Hot Body"	2025	None	Claire Bishara	
"Who's Dat Girl"	2025	Rema	Meji Alabi	
"Tornado"	2026	None	Melchior Leroux	

=== As featured artist ===
List of music videos as featured artist, showing year released and director
Title	Year	Other artist(s)	Director(s)	Ref.
"Call"	2022	Iyanya	Olu The Wave	
"Options"	2022	L.A.X	Nouvelle Films	
"Overloading (OVERDOSE)"	2022	Crayon, LADIPOE, Magixx and Boy Spyce	Director K	
"Love Don't Cost a Dime (Re-Up)"	2022	Magixx	Olu The Wave	
"Jane"	2022	Skip Marley	Mid Jordan	
"2 Sugar"	2022	Wizkid	Child	
"Stamina"	2023	Tiwa Savage; Young Jonn	Clarence Peters	
"Disturbing U"	2023	Darkoo	Capone X Shala	
"How Many Times"	2023	DJ Big N Oxlade	Perliks Pictures	
"Girl Next Door"	2023	Tyla	Unknown	
"My Love"	2023	Leigh-Anne Pinnock	Meji Alabi	
"No Love"	2023	Ninho	Unknown	
"Ngozi"	2023	Crayon	Director K	
"Big FU"	2023	David Guetta; Lil Durk	Shapxo	
"Santa"	2024	Rvssian; Rauw Alejandro	Juan Pablo	
"You're Hired"	2024	NEIKED	Alexander Peri	
"Hypé"	2024	Aya Nakamura	Yanis Challab	
"PINACOLADA"	2024	Thisizlondon; 6Lack	James Bahman	
"Bora Bora"	2024	AP Dhillon	Michelle Parker	
"Mon Bébé"	2026	RnBoi	Zaven	
"Aye Kan"	2026	Angélique Kidjo	Emmanuel Mensah Agbeble	
"Colorado"	2026	Johnny Drille; Young Jonn	Amaru5s	
"Treat U Right"	2026	Fola	Don Prod	

=== Performance videos ===
List of performance videos, showing year released and director
Title	Year	Other performer(s) credited	Director(s)	Ref.
"Bloody Samaritan"	2021	None	Unknown	
"Bloody Samaritan (Remix)"	Kelly Rowland	Prime		
"21"	2024	None	Annie Bercy	
"Control"	2024	None	Annie Bercy	
"Birds Sing of Money"	2024	None	Annie Bercy	
"Commas"	2024	None	Skyler Brown	
"All The Love"	2025	None	Ella Ezeike	

== Filmography ==
=== Film ===
List of films and roles
Year	Title	Role	Notes	Ref.
2024	Dare To Dream	Herself	Amazon Prime Video documentary	
2024	Christmas in Lagos	Herself	Cameo	
2027	Children of Blood and Bone	TBA	Narrative role	

=== Television ===
List of television appearances and roles
Year	Title	Role	Notes	Ref.
2021	Nigerian Idol	Herself, Musical guest	Season 6 Grand Finale	
2021	Big Brother Naija	Herself, Musical guest	Season 6 (Kingsize Eviction Show)	
2024	MTV Push	Herself, Performer		
2024	The Tonight Show Starring Jimmy Fallon	Herself, Musical guest	Season 11, Episode 159	
2024	The Today Show (with Coldplay)	Herself, Musical guest	Citi Concert Series	
2026	The Jennifer Hudson Show	Herself, Performer	Season 4, Episode 133	
2026	Tiny Desk Concerts	Herself, Performer	Black Music Month	
