= Heaven Baby (song) =

Ayra Starr song featuring Zayn Malik

Single by Ayra Starr featuring Zayn

from the album Starr Girl
- Released: 25 September 2026
- Genre: R&B; vocal pop
- Length: 2:38
- Label: Mavin; Republic
- Songwriters: Gregory Hein; Isaiah Tejeda; Abby Keen; Sarah Orankisiyola
- Producers: Stefan Johnson , Jordan K,Suero Jr

Ayra Starr singles chronology
"Tornado" (2026)	"Heaven Baby" (2026)

Music video
- "Heaven Baby" on YouTube

"Heaven Baby" is a song recorded and released by Nigerian singer songwriter Ayra Starr featuring English singer Zayn from the album Starr Girl.

== Background ==
The song was released as the 14th official track from Ayra Starr's third studio album Starr Girl. Starr started teasing the collaboration featured on her album by saving their pictures as profile picture of all her social media accounts. She used British rapper and singer Kwn picture for her YouTube account, Venezuelan singer Danny Ocean picture for her TikTok while American singer-songwriter Leon Thomas picture for her Facebook page. She then posted English singer Zayn Malik as her Instagram profile picture while Zayn Malik also changed his Instagram profile picture and posted Ayra Starr to promote their upcoming song and Starr's third studio album Starr Girl. The album was released on the 14th of August 2026 to critical acclaim while many praised Starr's versatility on the album and collaboration featured on the album.

== Reviews and impact ==
Heaven Baby quickly became a fan favourite from the album, with many critics praising both Ayra Starr and Zayn's musical chemistry on the song. Fans also commended the two artist's vocals for blending seamlessly.

The song debut with a total of 637K Spotify steams on its first day while going to a total of 6 Million Spotify steams as of 10 days after the album's release. The song charted number in 12 countries on Spotify including Nigeria, Botswana, Benin, Sierra Leone, Ghana, Saint Lucia & Trinad and Tobago to name the few. It debuted on Top 2 of the UK Afrobeats Singles Chart for week 23 August 2026.

== Charts ==
Chart performance for "Tornado"
Chart (2026)	Peak position
New Zealand Hot Singles (RMNZ)	26
Nigeria (TurnTable Top 100)	2
South Africa Streaming (TOSAC)	15
Suriname (Nationale Top 40)	1
UK Afrobeats (Official Charts)	1
UK British Asian (OCC)	1
UK Video Streaming (Official Charts)	50
