= Unavailable (song) =

Single by Davido featuring Musa Keys

from the album Timeless
- Released: 11 April 2023
- Genre: Amapiano; afrobeats
- Length: 3:03
- Label: DMW; Columbia; Sony
- Songwriters: David Adeleke; Logos Olori; Musa Keys; Tobechukwu Okolie
- Producers: Rage; Magicsticks

Davido singles chronology
"Stand Strong" (2022)	"Unavailable" (2023)	"Sensational" (2023)

Musa Keys singles chronology
"Your Body" (2022)	"Unavailable" (2023)	"Kufeziwe" (2022)

Music video
- ”Unavailable” on YouTube

"Unavailable" is a song by Nigerian singer Davido. It features vocals by South African singer Musa Keys, and was released on 11 April 2023, as the second single his fourth studio album Timeless (2023). "Unavailable" peaked at number 1 on the UK Afrobeats Singles Chart for five weeks and reached number 3 on the Billboard U.S. Afrobeats Songs chart. On 12 May 2023, Davido released an extended play of five remixed versions of the track. "Unavailable" was nominated at the 66th Annual Grammy Awards for Best African Music Performance.

== Background ==
The song features complementary vocals by South African singer Musa Keys and was co-produced by Ragee and Magicsticks. On the day of the album's release, Davido launched a dance challenge on TikTok, which has received over 600,000 posts. The official music video for "Unavailable" was directed by Dammy Twitch and filmed in South Africa. A remix of "Unavailable", featuring Major Lazer, was released on 11 August. Another remix of the song was released on 18 August, and features a rap verse by American rapper Latto.

== Composition ==
Afrocritik defined "Unavailable" as "a tightly-controlled, message-filled, highly danceable club tune".

== Commercial performance ==
The song debuted at number eight on the Billboard U.S. Afrobeats Songs chart, and at 13 on the Billboard World Digital Song Sales. The song also made it to Spotify's 2023 Songs of Summer predictions.

== Track listing and formats ==
One-track digital single

1. "Unavailable" – 2:49

Five-track digital single

1. "Unavailable" (sped up version) – 2:22
2. "Unavailable" (sped up faster version) – 2:11
3. "Unavailable" (slowed down version) – 3:24
4. "Unavailable" (instrumental version) – 2:49
5. "Unavailable" (a cappella version) – 2:59

== Credits and personnel ==
Credits adapted from Spotify.

- Davido – vocals, songwriting
- Musa Keys – vocals, songwriting
- Ragee – production
- Magicsticks – co-producer

== Charts ==
Weekly chart performance for "Unavailable"
Chart (2023–2024)	Peak position
France (SNEP)	134
Netherlands (Single Top 100)	57
New Zealand Hot Singles (RMNZ)	19
Nigeria (TurnTable Top 50)	2
Suriname (Nationale Top 40)	4
Switzerland (Schweizer Hitparade)	40
UK Singles (Official Charts)	52
UK Hip Hop/R&B (Official Charts)	25
UK Afrobeats (Official Charts)	1
US Afrobeats Songs (Billboard)	3
US Rhythmic Airplay (Billboard)	25
US World Digital Song Sales (Billboard)	3

== Certifications ==
Certifications for "Unavailable"
Region	Certification	Certified units/sales
Canada (Music Canada)	Platinum	80,000^{‡}
France (SNEP)	Gold	100,000^{‡}
New Zealand (RMNZ)	Gold	15,000^{‡}
Nigeria (TCSN)	3× Platinum	300,000^{‡}
Switzerland (IFPI Switzerland)	2× Platinum	40,000^{‡}
United Kingdom (BPI)	Gold	400,000^{‡}
United States (RIAA)	Gold	500,000^{‡}
^{‡} Sales+streaming figures based on certification alone.

== Release history ==
Release history and formats for "Unavailable"
Region	Date	Format	Label	Ref.
Various	11 April 2023	Digital download; streaming	DMW; Columbia; Sony	
