= Starrgirl =

Studio album by Ayra Starr
- Released: 14 August 2026
- Labels: Mavin; Republic
- Producers: Alissia; Ayra Starr; Johnny Drille; the Elements; Ilya; Matt James; Stefan Johnson; Jordan K.; London; Mamii; Mikababeatz; D. Phelps; Ragee; Joe Reeves; Shizzi; Skillies; Teemode; Vybeo; Xize

Ayra Starr chronology
The Year I Turned 21 (2024)	Starrgirl (2026)

Singles from Starrgirl
- 1. "Tornado" Released: 12 June 2026; 2. "Heaven Baby" Released: 25 September 2026

Starrgirl is the third studio album by the Nigerian singer and songwriter Ayra Starr. It was released on 14 August 2026, through Mavin and Republic Records. The album features guest appearances from Kwn, Danny Ocean, Rema, Theodora, Leon Thomas, Wizkid, and Zayn. Starr collaborated with various producers on the album, including Alissia, Johnny Drille, Ilya, Stefan Johnson, Jordan K., London, Mamii, Ragee, and Shizzi, among others.

Starrgirl was preceded by the single "Tornado", which reached the top ten in Nigeria, the UK Afrobeats Singles Chart and the Billboard US Afrobeats Songs. The album also features the previously-released singles "Gimme Dat", "Hot Body", "Who's Dat Girl", and "Where Do We Go". On 26 September 2026, "Heaven Baby" was released as the album's second single.

== Background ==
Following the release of her second studio album The Year I Turned 21 (2024), Starr said she had begun approaching music differently. In an interview with the Evening Standard in March 2025, she explained she was moving away from being "obsessed with being an album artist" to focus on making music with less pressure. Throughout 2025, Starr released a number of singles, beginning with "All the Love" in February and "Gimme Dat" featuring Wizkid, in April. In July, she signed a management deal with Roc Nation while remaining signed to Mavin Records as a recording artist. That same month, she released "Hot Body", and later released "Who's Dat Girl", her first official collaboration with Rema, in October.

In January 2026, Starr revealed that work on her third studio album was underway and said in Spotify's Our Frequency zine that it was expected to be released later that year. During an Apple Music Radio takeover in March, she described the project as reflecting her personal and artistic growth, stating that she was "becoming a woman" and exploring new sounds. She also said the album marked a return to making music for enjoyment after taking the industry "a bit too seriously". The album was recorded in several locations, with most of the work taking place in New York City and Lagos. Discussing the project's message in a separate interview, Starr said she was less concerned with proving herself than on previous releases and hoped the album would inspire listeners to pursue bigger ambitions.

== Composition ==
=== Songs ===
"Gimme Dat", a duet with Wizkid, is an Afrobeats song, built on a sample of Wyclef Jean and Mary J. Blige's 2000 single "911". It pairs an acoustic guitar loop with a groove-driven rhythm. Lyrically, the track explores themes of romantic desire and commitment. Starr seeks a genuine relationship, and Wizkid offers assurances of loyalty. Zimiso Nyamande of The Music Review regarded the song as a blend of Starr's "fiery, youthful energy" and Wizkid's "smooth, seasoned charm", while Quincy Dominic of Ratings Game Music was drawn to its "uptempo, funky" sound and "sensual undertone".

"Tornado" is about dismissing external approval and asserting confidence through self-worth, status, and feminine power; its synth-pop and afropop arrangement incorporates pulsating Latin percussion and lower-register crooning. In "Hot Body", Starr explores themes of bodily autonomy, allure, and self-possession over a midtempo fusion of afrobeats, dancehall, alt-pop and R&B elements. The Native's Damilola Animashaun observed a "youthful swagger that has mutated into deliberate elegance" in the track, adding that Starr sings with the "relaxed certitude" of a woman fully in charge of her own "sexuality and space."

"Where Do We Go" opens with a piano melody that gives way to a heavier beat as Starr's vocals enter. The production layers crisp snaps, claps, and a deep, pulsing bassline, blending afropop rhythms with electronic textures. Inspired by a real situationship experience involving authentic feelings despite an unlikely future, the verses recount a recurring late-night pattern: arriving somewhere in a luxury car, frequenting the spot multiple times, and concealing the visits from friends. The chorus turns the title into a direct, yet unresolved question. For "Who's Dat Girl", Starr and Rema settle into a syncopated, dancehall-leaning bounce anchored by afrodance instrumentation. Its melodic phrasing carries Middle Eastern touches that Exclaim!'s Natoli Ibrahim heard fused with a "luscious R&B tonality." While balancing seduction with restraint, it treats its title less as a question than a boast, as Starr casts herself as the focus of attention in a teasing back-and-forth with Rema.

== Release and promotion ==
=== Title and artwork ===
On 16 April 2026, during an appearance on The Jennifer Hudson Show, Starr announced the album's title as Starrgirl and initially stated a July 2026 release date. The following month, she pushed the release to 14 August. Rather than referencing fame or celebrity, the title is based on personal multiplicity, the idea of an artist encompassing a plurality of distinct identities at once. It extends this into a cosmic image, likening Starr to a galaxy: not one star, but a composed field of stars and planets existing together. The name functions as a bridge between "tradition and self," connecting where she comes from with the new creative path she is pursuing.

Starr, on the importance of the color purple

Purple, for me, was a mixture of pink and black. It doesn't make sense color theory-wise, but [...] it's like both sides, yin yang, [...] masculine, feminine. I feel like 19 & Dangerous was a whole different era, The Year I Turned 21 was a whole different era, and with Starrgirl, it's like both of that merging. So that's what purple means to me.

— Today

Starr unveiled the album cover on social media and Roc Nation's website. Paris-based photographer Axle Jozeph, who had also contributed to the cover imagery for her 2025 single "All the Love", shot the album cover, which was produced by Oyinkan Adeshoye. Creative direction was handled by Peter Famosa, Richie Igunma, and Ola Badmus, with design by Michael Junioro and Kente Kwame. The artwork shows Starr against a black background in a sci-fi-inspired composition, wearing a metallic gold bodycon mini dress and purple gele while projecting a purple-pink laser beam from her outstretched hand. Starr explained on Capital XTRA that the gele was not part of the original concept and was added the day before the shoot, after she decided the final look needed to feel authentic to her. She linked the choice to her Yoruba upbringing and said she wanted the cover to make young Nigerian girls "feel very represented."

A writer from Music Custodian wrote that the artwork merges "distinctly African visual identity with futuristic imagination," describing Starr's gele as a West African symbol of elegance and femininity that is "recontextualized within an almost cybernetic world, creating an Afrofuturist aesthetic that feels both rooted and forward-facing." The writer added that the image presented Starr as an artist building "a complete visual universe around her identity." In a May 2026 piece for Marie Claire, fashion journalist Ashim Ojeh credited the cover as a catalyst for renewed interest in the gele, remarking that the reveal alone "was enough to spark widespread reactions" and inspire online reinterpretations of the look. Examining its societal impact, OkayAfrica's Chinonyelum Iwu traced the resulting "purple gele trend" among Starr's male fans to broader debates about masculinity in Nigeria. She cited a 22-year-old university student who wore the headwrap to class and declared he was "not afraid of anything."

=== Marketing ===
Interviews were granted to Apple Music's Africa Now Radio and Way Up with Angela Yee in March of 2026 to garner early interest. The next month, a listening party for Starr's fanbase, known as Mobstarrs, took place at Tape Lagos in Victoria Island, where attendees previewed unreleased material from the project, including "Tornado", "Midnight in New York", "Ms Paper" with French-Congolese artist Theodora, and "Pressure" with Leon Thomas. On 7 May, Rihanna shared a Met Gala behind-the-scenes video on social media using Starr and Rema's "Who's Dat Girl" as background audio, bringing further attention to Starrgirl's rollout. Pre-orders for the album opened in both digital and physical formats, including signed vinyl and signed CD editions. The vinyl was issued as a purple swirl pressing and was limited to four copies per customer.

Press engagements resumed in June 2026. Starr guested on the French radio station Skyrock FM around the time Deezer held a Starrgirl listening session in Paris through its Club programme, an exclusive event attended by Theodora. In the United Kingdom, Schön! magazine spotlighted Starr as an "international it-girl" in its 50th issue. She stopped at Kiss Xtra and BBC Radio 1Xtra, sat down for a one-on-one on The Dotty Show, and was featured on Capital XTRA Breakfast. As part of the promotional campaign, Starr headlined the opening night of the Zsongo World Tour at Koko in Camden, appeared on NPR's Tiny Desk Concerts series for Black Music Month, and performed a set for Boiler Room London. During all three events, she showcased "Tornado", which had been announced as the album's lead single. Clash magazine named her the seventh face of its 134th issue, characterizing Starrgirl as a "blockbuster" reinvention of pop and Starr herself as a "soul in flux". By the end of July 2026, her public appearances and social media activity were temporarily curtailed as she underwent a medical procedure. Starr disclosed on Instagram that she had hoped for "a quick recovery but it was more complicated than [...] expected." She said she needed "a bit of rest" and requested continued album pre-orders.

Despite the pause, on 3 August 2026, a 35-second cinematic teaser trailer was uploaded to YouTube. The clip follows Starr in a short, fitted turquoise-blue satin mini dress with a V-neckline, her voluminous black curls falling past her waist, as she walks through an urban passage, climbs a fire escape, and reaches a rooftop overlooking a brightly lit city skyline. Above her, glowing stars form the album title across the night sky. The trailer was accompanied by a Spotify Countdown Page showing that Starrgirl would contain 16 tracks, although only five titles were displayed: "Gimme Dat" as track three, Tornado" as track five, "Hot Body" as track seven, "Where Do We Go" as track ten, and "Who's Dat Girl" as track 11. All five were top-ten entries on the TurnTable Top 100 Songs and the Billboard U.S. Afrobeats Songs charts, along with top-five placements on the UK Afrobeats Singles Chart. "Who's Dat Girl" performed strongest in the UK, reaching number one, while peaking highest on Billboard at number three. In Nigeria, it debuted at number two, whereas "Gimme Dat" and "Hot Body" entered at number three, with each earning a platinum certification from the TurnTable Certification System of Nigeria.

Starr bypassed a traditional track listing announcement in favor of interactive digital strategies to tease the album's content. She updated her profile pictures across X, Instagram, TikTok, Facebook, and YouTube to images of featured artists, such as Theodora, Zayn Malik, Kwn, Danny Ocean, and Thomas. Malik reciprocated by changing his own display picture to that of Starr. To unveil the full track list, she launched "Starr Search", a FanArcade web-based experience that allowed fans to explore a virtual sky to unlock all 16 titles. In New York City, she hosted a third listening party on 5 August 2026, requiring prospective guests to request venue details through an online RSVP portal. On 7 August 2026, she gave her second live performance on NBC's Today show as part of the Citi Concert Series.

== Critical reception ==
Professional ratings
Review scores
Source	Rating
Afrocritik	8.5/10
Clash	8/10
The Native	7.5/10
NME	4.5/5 stars
Pulse Nigeria	7/10
Shatter the Standards	3/5 stars

Starrgirl received generally positive reviews from music critics. Kyann-Sian Williams of NME awarded the album 4.5 stars out of 5, adding that Ayra Starr "pushes the parameters of her style to make room for more of what’s already in her arsenal." Afrocritik's Yinoluwa Olowofoyeku described Starrgirl as a "highly cohesive and impressively assembled album' that "elevates Ayra Starr to the forefront of her peers", rating it 8.5 out of 10. Chibuzo Emmanuel of The Native said that it can "go down as a classic", praising its "thematic breadth, intimate lyrics, sticky hooks, and calibration" and giving it a rating of 7.5 out of 10.

Temiloluwa Adeyemo, reviewing for Clash magazine, characterized the album as "a fuller picture of an artist still growing, still curious and increasingly certain of who she wants to be", and gave it an 8 out of 10. In a review for Pulse Nigeria, Adeayo Adebiyi described the album as a "pop manifesto of a superstar", praising its "imposing quality of the production", "artistic excellence", and "well-curated supporting cast of features and songwriters"; he rated it a 7 out of 10. Ameenah Laquita of Shatter the Standards highlighted the tracks "Gimme Dat", "Tornado", and "Who's Dat Girl", awarding the album a rating of 3 out of 5 stars.

== Track listing ==
Digital edition track listing
No.	Title	Writer(s)	Producer(s)	Length
1.	"Dangerous"	Oyinkansola Sarah Aderibigbe; Promise Ekpe; Nwamu Chukwudubem; Adinu Mauthon	Ragee; Johnny Drille; Xize; Fermin Suero Jr.^{[v]}; Vaedar^{[v]}	2:06
2.	"Amazing" (featuring kwn)	O. S. Aderibigbe; Khyra Wilson; Darius Coleman	The Elements^{[v]}; Joe Reeves; Suero Jr.^{[v]}	2:44
3.	"Gimme Dat" (with Wizkid)	O. S. Aderibigbe; Ayodeji Ibrahim Balogun; Adekunle Oluwaseyi; Elvis Akujobi; Richard Imaekhai; Fred Daniels; Edafe Gabriel; Olusola Mayowa; Aniekeme Akpan; Jerry Duplessis; Katia Cadet; Mary Brown; Wyclef Jean	Vybeo; Mikababeatz	3:45
4.	"Pressure" (featuring Leon Thomas)	O. S. Aderibigbe; Thomas; Oritsesan Alero; Oluwadamilar David Aderibigbe; Lazaro Camejo; Chinomso Ohajianya	The Elements^{[v]}; Suero Jr.^{[v]}	2:24
5.	"Tornado"	Ephrem Lopez Jr.; Kofi Amponsah; Donel Mangena; Afolarin Odunlami; Oluwaseyi Akerele	Skillies; Shizzi; the Elements^{[a]}; RiotUSA^{[a]}; Suero Jr.^{[v]}	2:54
6.	"Midnight in New York"	O. S. Aderibigbe; Mangena; André & Kadu	Ayra Starr; Matt James; London; Suero Jr.^{[v]}	3:32
7.	"Hot Body"	O. S. Aderibigbe; Ekpe; Ikechukwu Nnaemeka; Keven Wolfsohn; Paul Goller	Ragee; the Elements	2:40
8.	"Ms. Paper" (featuring Theodora)	O. S. Aderibigbe; Lili Théodora Mbangayo Mujinga; Akil King; Atia Boggs	The Elements^{[v]}; Suero Jr.^{[v]}	2:48
9.	"Dance"	O. S. Aderibigbe; Mauthon	Xize; Drille^{[a]}; Suero Jr.^{[v]}; Vaedar^{[v]}	2:38
10.	"Where Do We Go"	O. S. Aderibigbe; Amanda Ibanez; Mason Tanner; Malika Hamza; Ilya Salmanzadeh	Ilya; Suero Jr.^{[v]}	2:56
11.	"Who's Dat Girl" (with Rema)	O. S. Aderibigbe; Divine Ikubor; Chukwudubem; Osamudiamen Ekunwe; Ekpe; Nilusi Nissanka	Ragee; the Elements; Drille^{[a]}	2:52
12.	"Misunderstood"	O. S. Aderibigbe; Coleman; Adanna Nneamaka Duru	The Elements^{[v]}; Suero Jr.^{[v]}	3:01
13.	"Letter to God"	O. S. Aderibigbe; Shawntoni Ajanae Nichols; David Kenneth Phelps; Alissia Benveniste	D Phelps; Mamii; the Elements^{[a]}; Suero Jr.^{[v]}; Alissia	3:27
14.	"Heaven Baby" (featuring Zayn)	O. S. Aderibigbe; Gregory Hein; Isaiah Tejada; Abby Keen	Stefan Johnson; Jordan K.; Suero Jr.^{[v]}	2:38
15.	"Treasure"	O. S. Aderibigbe; Prince Omoferi	Teemode; Drille; Mbryo^{[a]}; Paul Norris^{[v]}	2:39
16.	"Hot Body" (remix; featuring Danny Ocean)	O. S. Aderibigbe; Ocean; Jesús Miguel Zayas; Ekpe	Ragee; the Elements	3:01

Physical edition track listing
No.	Title	Writer(s)	Producer(s)	Length
1.	"Amazing" (featuring kwn)	O. S. Aderibigbe; Wilson; Coleman	The Elements^{[v]}; Reeves; Suero Jr.^{[v]}
2.	"Ms. Paper" (featuring Theodora)	O. S. Aderibigbe; King; Mbangayo Mujinga; Boggs	The Elements^{[v]}; Suero Jr.^{[v]}
3.	"Letter to God"	O. S. Aderibigbe; Nichols; Phelps; Benveniste	D Phelps; Mamii; the Elements^{[a]}; Suero Jr.^{[v]}; Alissia
4.	"Misunderstood"	O. S. Aderibigbe; Coleman; Duru	The Elements^{[v]}; Suero Jr.^{[v]}
5.	"Pressure" (featuring Leon Thomas)	O. S. Aderibigbe; Thomas; Alero; O. D. Aderibigbe; Camejo; Ohajianya	The Elements^{[v]}; Suero Jr.^{[v]}
6.	"Tornado"	Lopez Jr.; Amponsah; Mangena; Odunlami; Akerele	Skillies; Shizzi; the Elements^{[a]}; RiotUSA^{[a]}; Suero Jr.^{[v]}
7.	"Hot Body"	O. S. Aderibigbe; Ekpe; Nnaemeka; Wolfsohn; Goller	Ragee; the Elements
8.	"Where Do We Go"	Ibanez; Tanner; Hamza; O. S. Aderibigbe; Salmanzadeh	Ilya; Suero Jr.^{[v]}
9.	"Who's Dat Girl" (featuring Rema)	O. S. Aderibigbe; Ikubor; Chukwudubem; Ekunwe; Ekpe; Nissanka	Ragee; the Elements; Drille^{[a]}
10.	"Gimme Dat" (with Wizkid)	O. S. Aderibigbe; Balogun; Oluwaseyi; Akujobi; Imaekhai; Daniels; Gabriel; Mayowa; Akpan; Duplessis; Cadet; Brown; Jean	Vybeo; Mikababeatz

=== Notes ===
- ^{^[a]} denotes an additional producer.
- ^{^[v]} denotes a vocal producer.
- "Gimme Dat" contains a sample of "911" (2000), written by Wyclef Jean, Jerry Duplessis, Katia Cadet, and Mary Brown, and performed by Jean and Mary J. Blige.

== Personnel ==
The credits are adapted from Tidal.

=== Musicians ===
- Ayra Starr – vocals (all tracks); bass, drums, guitar, synthesizer (track 6); background vocals (tracks 14, 15)
- Johnny Drille – synthesizer, violin (track 1); guitar (tracks 9, 15); bass, drums (track 15)
- Ragee – bass, drums (tracks 1, 16); keyboards (track 1); guitar, piano, programming (track 16)
- Lovn – additional vocals (track 1)
- Terry Apala – additional vocals (track 1)
- Promise the Guitarist – guitar (track 1)
- The Elements – bass, drums (tracks 2, 4, 5, 8, 12); keyboards (tracks 2, 4, 8, 12), guitar (tracks 5, 16), synthesizer (tracks 5, 8); piano, programming (track 16)
- Joe Reeves – drums, guitar (track 2)
- Kwn – vocals (track 2)
- Bazzmansamphilz – bass (track 3)
- Wizkid – vocals (track 3)
- Leon Thomas – vocals (track 4)
- Shizzi – bass, drums, guitar, synthesizer (track 5)
- Skillies – bass, drums, guitar, synthesizer (track 5)
- Donel – vocals (track 5)
- Fola – vocals (track 5)
- London – bass, drums, guitar, synthesizer (track 6)
- Matt James – bass, drums, guitar, synthesizer (track 6)
- Theodora – vocals (track 8)
- Adinu Samuel – additional vocals (track 9)
- Ireti Holo – additional vocals (track 9)
- Xize – bass, drums, piano (track 9)
- Hamzaa – background vocals (track 10)
- Ilya – background vocals, bass, drums, keyboards, programming, synthesizer (track 10)
- Maesu – background vocals (track 10)
- Nilusi – additional vocals (track 11)
- Ugbekile Osemeke – additional vocals (track 11)
- David Ranger – guitar (track 12)
- Mamii – background vocals, bass, drums, guitar (track 13)
- D. Phelps – drums, guitar, keyboards (track 13)
- Alissia – bass, keyboards (track 13)
- Jordan K – bass, keyboards (track 14)
- Stefan Johnson – bass, keyboards (track 14)
- Zayn – vocals (track 14)
- Teemode – bass, drums, keyboards (track 15)
- Danny Ocean – vocals (track 16)

=== Technical ===
- Fermino Suero Jr. – engineering (tracks 1, 2, 4–10, 12, 14)
- Morrelo – engineering (track 1)
- The Elements – engineering (tracks 2, 4, 5, 8, 12, 16)
- Sean Phelan – engineering (track 3)
- Ilya – engineering, recording arrangement (track 10)
- Juan Arguello – engineering (track 10)
- Bryce Bordone – engineering (track 10)
- Paul Noris – engineering (track 15)
- Johnny Drille – mixing, mastering (tracks 1, 3, 6, 9, 11, 14, 15)
- Jean-Marie Horvat – mixing (tracks 2, 4, 5, 8, 12)
- Serban Ghenea – mixing (track 10)
- Leandro "Dro" Hildago – mixing (track 11)
- Colin Leonard – mastering (tracks 2, 4, 5, 8, 12)
- Randy Merrill – mastering (track 10)

== Charts ==
Chart performance
Chart (2026)	Peak position
French Albums (SNEP)	100
Nigerian Albums (TurnTable)	2
UK Album Downloads (Official Charts)	27
UK R&B Albums (Official Charts)	8
US World Albums (Billboard)	4
