= Tornado (Ayra Starr song) =

2026 single by Ayra Starr

Single by Ayra Starr

from the album Starr Girl
- Released: 12 June 2026
- Recorded: 2026
- Genre: Afrobeats; Afropop
- Length: 2:54
- Label: Mavin; Republic
- Songwriters: Ephrem Lopez Jr.; Kofi Amponsah; Donel Mangena; Afolarin Temiloluwa Odunlami; Oluwaseyi Akerele
- Producers: Skillies; Shizzi; The Elements; RiotUSA

Ayra Starr singles chronology
"Colorado" (2026)	"Tornado" (2026)	"Wo, man" (2026)

Music video
- "Tornado" on YouTube

"Tornado" is a song by Nigerian singer-songwriter Ayra Starr from her third studio album, Starr Girl. It was released on 12 June 2026 by Mavin and Republic Records.

The song was written by Ephrem Lopez Jr., Kofi Amponsah, Donel Mangena, Afolarin Temiloluwa Odunlami, and Oluwaseyi Akerele. Its production was handled primarily by Skillies and Shizzi, with additional contributions by The Elements and RiotUSA. "Tornado" is an afrobeats and afropop song whose lyrics center on self-worth, social status and personal presence. Music critics generally responded positively, with particular attention given to its direct songwriting, rhythmic arrangement, and confident vocal delivery.

The accompanying music video, directed by Melchior Leroux, uses surreal imagery that depicts Starr towering over a miniature city and trapping onlookers in strands of her hair. Reception toward the music video was also positive, with reviewers praising its styling, visual concept, and presentation of Starr’s authority.

== Background and release ==
Following the release of her second studio album, The Year I Turned 21, in May 2024, Ayra Starr issued a series of singles throughout 2025, including "All the Love", "Hot Body", and "Who's Dat Girl" with Rema. By January 2026, she had returned to album production, telling Spotify's Our Frequency zine that her third studio album was expected later in the year. She released "Where Do We Go" as the first single from the project on 6 March, ten days before "Tornado" was first teased publicly during a Twitch livestream hosted by PlaqueBoyMax. On 27 March, she performed it live for the first time at the 28th Africa Business Conference Soirée in Boston, after which she held a listening party for her fanbase, known as the Mobstarrs, at Tape Lagos in Victoria Island, where attendees heard unreleased material from the album, among them "Tornado". On 16 April, Starr appeared on The Jennifer Hudson Show, officially announcing Starr Girl as the album's title and a July 2026 release date, which was pushed to 14 August. She resumed promoting "Tornado" in mid-May 2026, sharing photos and short videos on Instagram that featured audio snippets of the track. On 1 June, she unveiled the cover art, confirmed 12 June 2026 as the release date, and made the track available for pre-save; a 29-second preview was also uploaded to her official YouTube channel. In the days leading up to its release, Starr showcased "Tornado" at events such as the opening night of the Zsongo World Tour at Koko in Camden, NPR's Tiny Desk Concerts series for Black Music Month, and a one-off Boiler Room show in London titled STARRGIRL.

== Production and composition ==
"Tornado" was written by Ephrem Lopez Jr., Kofi Amponsah, Donel Mangena, Afolarin Temiloluwa Odunlami, and Oluwaseyi Akerele. It was produced by Skillies and Shizzi, with additional production by The Elements and RiotUSA. Recording was handled by The Elements and Fermin Suero Jr., with the latter serving as vocal producer; Jean-Marie Horvat mixed the track, and Colin Leonard mastered it. Odunlami, who performs as Fola, also provided vocals.

Set in D minor over a tempo of 126 beats per minute, "Tornado" runs two minutes and fifty-four seconds. It is an afrobeats and afropop song built on rhythmic percussion and melodic textures. The arrangement incorporates drum kit, bass, guitar, and synthesizer, performed by Skillies, Shizzi, and The Elements. Lyrically, the song centers on themes of self-worth, social status, and personal presence, delivered primarily in English with integrated Nigerian slang and a sparing use of Yoruba. According to Alex Harris of Neon Music, the songwriting "lands in its blunt physicality", especially in lines such as "My figure no be fable" and "My body tea like boba". BellaNaija viewed it as a "confident anthem" in which Starr positions herself as the "ultimate center of attention," employing direct lyricism to celebrate her charisma and physical appeal. The publication cited the line "Inflation, I'm the price they wanna beat," writing that the wordplay on economic value served as a playful acknowledgment of her rising industry stature. It also mentioned that the track extends its themes to social celebration, pointing to lyrics about being in the club with her friends and treating each day like a new year. In an interview with EE72, Starr detailed her mindset during the studio session and expanded on the song's meaning:

I'm [...] just saying, whine like tornado. I went to the studio and I wanted to whine. It's written so poetically, and even [...] the melodies feel very grandiose and from the pre-hook and everything, but it's [...] about me just whining my waist like a tornado.

== Critical reception ==
Pulse.ng's Gift Davies felt that while the afrobeats and afropop blend was characteristic of Starr's established sound, the execution was "sharper", and her vocals, along with those of Fola, carried a confidence that suggested full awareness of the moment. Robin Murray from Clash Music called it an "afro-pop sizzler" suited to the summer season, lauding it as "a song of carnal desire and untapped emotion." In his review for NotjustOk, Peter Okhide observed that "Tornado" uses futuristic synth-pop elements, a driving syncopated bassline, and airy atmospheric pads, which he said gave it a "stadium-ready feel." Nmesoma Okechukwu of Euphoria compared the production to Dua Lipa's Future Nostalgia, observing that when Starr advises to "whine like tornado," the "rhythmic beat encourages you to do just that." OkayAfrica's Tšeliso Monaheng described the track as "in-your-face, boisterous, high-grade pop music," commenting that it conveyed a "pure, pulsating attitude" and dubbed it "expressway-type music" for its outsized ambition. Collins Badewa of StyleRave remarked on Starr's vocals, stating that she shifts "between emotional vulnerability and commanding confidence," and commended what he termed an "immersive listening experience." Julie Dam from The Honey Pop similarly wrote that the chorus seemed to lodge itself in the listener's memory on first listen, picking it as the "perfect party song" for the summer. Quincy Dominic of Ratings Game Music, who gave the song four out of five stars, opined that its tempo allowed it to flow naturally, with the singer's melodic verses and catchy hook driving the song forward. Rolling Out's Jeric Macaraan thought that the production reinforced this energy without apology, adding that its momentum pushed Starr’s sound into something "more assertive."

== Music video ==
=== Development ===
The music video was directed by Melchior Leroux, who also handled visual effects, and produced by DÉPENDANT under the executive producership of Fayssal Naït Moussa. Théo Gély worked as director of photography, supported by Mathieu Perez and Amandine Patout as first and second assistant directors. Creative direction was led by a London-based team operating under the ScaryTown banner, with Michael Junioro as creative director and Oyinkanza as producer. Filming utilized chroma key backdrops alongside set design by Sabrina Jill. Editing and color grading were handled in post-production by Eugène Signoret and Nicolas Gautier respectively. On the styling front, Anna Trevelyan led the wardrobe team, assisted by Devante Rollins among others, while Marie Van Wynsberghe and Kiyane Guitton oversaw hair and makeup. Casting was jointly directed by Sonny Donne and Eva Ayari, with Gabrielle Benkemoun coordinating production and Nina Perquis serving as line producer.

=== Synopsis ===
Starr performing near a painted crosswalk, while in the background, a line of men moves behind a blank octagonal sign.

The music video opens at night in a miniature city, where Starr lies on grass in front of dark apartment buildings with lit windows. The camera pulls back to show her curled inside a glowing globe, which then appears as Earth. The scene shifts to a blue studio set, where paparazzi cameras, microphones, and flashes surround her. A black cat emerges from an alley between two apartment blocks as Starr reclines nearby. She is later shown above rooftops near a hotel sign, and then crossing a painted crosswalk while a queue of men in formal attire stand behind a blank octagonal sign and watch her. Next, the video shows her reclining in the city's park bordered by a palm tree and chain-link fence, before the camera moves to dancers on rooftops of nearby buildings.

In another scene, Starr sits at one end of a long table in a room framed by metallic pillars, teal lighting, and dark red curtains, while photographers gather at the other end. A black cat crosses a curved ledge above them. The video then cuts to a red-lit sequence in which men aim vintage cameras at Starr; after she looks over her shoulder, the photographers are thrown backward and appear to fall away from strands of her hair. Later scenes show Starr singing beneath storm clouds, dancers performing in an open field, and male figures falling through the air toward the ground. She raises a checkered flag under purple clouds and the formally dressed men begin running to a giant projection of her face. In the final sequence, strands of Starr’s hair stretch across the night sky and form a web. Numerous figures are caught in the strands, including a woman in a blue airline-style uniform holding an orange suitcase, as Starr walks away.

=== Reception ===
Upon release, the music video for "Tornado" received positive reviews from critics, who praised its styling and visual concept. Nmesoma Okechukwu of Euphoria observed that the depiction of a giant-sized Starr folding onlookers into her braids illustrates her "overpowering aura." Alex Harris of Neon Music referred to the imagery as "literal" and said it elevates the song's self-belief "into something mythological." More broadly, Zimiso Nyamande from The Music Review described the visuals as "vibrant, stylish and packed with movement," stating that the clip showcases Starr's evolution as "a complete performer capable of balancing music, fashion and visual storytelling."

== Credits and personnel ==
Credits adapted from Spotify.

- Ayra Starr – lead vocals
- Fola – vocals, songwriter
- Skillies – producer, drum kit, bass, guitar, synthesizer
- Shizzi – producer, drum kit, bass, guitar, synthesizer
- The Elements – additional producer, recording engineer, drum kit, bass, guitar, synthesizer
- RiotUSA – additional producer
- Ephrem Lopez Jr. – songwriter
- Kofi Amponsah – songwriter
- Donel Mangena – songwriter
- Oluwaseyi Akerele – songwriter
- Fermin Suero, Jr. – vocal producer, recording engineer
- Jean-Marie Horvat – mixing engineer
- Colin Leonard – mastering engineer

== Charts ==
Chart performance for "Tornado"
Chart (2026)	Peak position
Nigeria (TurnTable Top 100)	7
UK Afrobeats (Official Charts)	5
US Afrobeats Songs (Billboard)	6
