= Alissia Benveniste =

Swiss record producer and musician

Alissia Benveniste, known mononymously as Alissia, is a Swiss record producer, songwriter, bassist, and DJ based in New York City. She has produced for Bootsy Collins, Anderson .Paak, Mary J. Blige, and others, and was nominated for Producer of the Year, Non-Classical at the 67th Annual Grammy Awards in 2025.

== Early life and education ==
Benveniste was born in Switzerland and raised in Italy. As a teenager she attended the Berklee College of Music Umbria Jazz clinics in Perugia as a pianist and vocalist, and was awarded a scholarship to the Berklee College of Music in Boston. She entered Berklee as a vocalist and switched to bass guitar during her studies. She majored in professional music and graduated in 2014.

== Career ==
While at the Berklee College of Music, Benveniste posted bass performance videos to YouTube. A 2014 video for her original song "Let It Out", filmed at and posted by the college, passed one million views. Prince saw the videos and invited her to Paisley Park to perform. In 2015 she released an EP, Back to the Functure, recorded with her band the Funketeers.

After moving to New York City, Benveniste shifted her focus to production. Bootsy Collins enlisted her to work on his 2017 album World Wide Funk, her first major credit as a producer. She subsequently collaborated with Anderson .Paak on a number of projects, including the 2024 NxWorries album Why Lawd?, and Paak introduced her to artists such as Mary J. Blige and Rae Khalil. She was credited as a producer on Blige's 2022 album Good Morning Gorgeous, which received Grammy nominations for Album of the Year at the 65th Annual Grammy Awards in 2023.

In 2024, Benveniste produced or co-produced songs by Jamila Woods ("Bugs" on Water Made Us), BJ the Chicago Kid ("Honey" featuring Chlöe and "Spend the Night" featuring Coco Jones), Rae Khalil, and Lion Babe, and contributed to Kaytranada's album Timeless. This body of work earned her a nomination for Producer of the Year, Non-Classical at the 67th Annual Grammy Awards in 2025. Her other production and songwriting credits include work with Calvin Harris, Mariah Carey, Lenny Kravitz, Bruno Mars, Daniel Caesar, Nile Rodgers, EarthGang, Mark Ronson, CeeLo Green, Musiq Soulchild, and Q-Tip.

In January 2026, Benveniste released the single "Hypnotic Night", featuring Nile Rodgers and EarthGang.

== Musical style ==
Benveniste draws funk and soul in both her production and bass playing. She often uses a Mu-Tron envelope filter pedal that was given to her by Bootsy Collins.

== Awards and nominations ==
Grammy Awards
Year	Category	Nominated work	Result	Ref.
2023	Album of the Year	Good Morning Gorgeous (as producer)	Nominated	
2023	Best R&B Album	Good Morning Gorgeous (as producer)	Nominated	
2025	Producer of the Year, Non-Classical	Herself	Nominated	
