= Colorado (Johnny Drille song) =

2026 single by Johnny Drille featuring Ayra Starr and Young John

Single by Johnny Drille featuring Ayra Starr and Young John

from the album Before The Morning Light
- Released: April 10, 2026
- Recorded: 2025–2026
- Studio: Mavin Records
- Genre: Afrobeats; R&B
- Length: 3:48
- Songwriters: John Ighodaro; Oyinkisola Aderibigbe; John Saviours Udomboso
- Composer: Johhny Drille
- Producers: Lord Cherd; Johnny Drille

Johnny Drille singles chronology
"Counting My Blessings" (2025)	"Colorado" (2026)	"Angels" (2026)

Ayra Starr singles chronology
"Aye Kan (Are You Coming Back)" (2026)	"Colorado" (2026)	"Tornado" (2026)

Young John singles chronology
"Cash Flow" (2025)	"Colorado" (2026)

"Colorado" is a single by Nigerian singer-producer Johnny Drille feat Nigerian singers Ayra Starr and Young Jonn released on April 10, 2026.

== Composition and background ==
The song blends contemporary R&B with Afrobeats while alternating between Afro-pop and dancehall. The song serves as Johnny Drille lead single to his new album Before the Morning Light. In Ayra Starr case is serves as her 2nd single of the year after "Where Do We Go". The song has been praised for its raw emotion and masculine desire while carrying regretts and non chalant.

== Personnel ==
Credits adapted from Spotify.

- Johnny Drille – performer, lyricist, and producer.
- Ayra Starr – performer, lyricist
- Young Jonn – performer, lyricist
- Lord Cherd – producer

== Charts ==
Chart performance for "Where Do We Go"
Chart (2026)	Peak position
Nigeria (TurnTable Top 100)	5
Nigeria Airplay (TurnTable)	40
UK Afrobeats Singles (OCC)	10
US Afrobeats Singles Chart (Billboard)	24
