= Rema =

Rema or REMA may refer to:

== Places ==
- Rema, Ethiopia, village in Amhara province, Ethiopia
- Rema Island, an island in Lake Tana, Ethiopia

== People ==
- Rema (musician), (born 2000), Nigerian singer and songwriter
- Rema Al-Thakafi, Saudi footballer
- Rema Hanna, American economist
- Rema Namakula, (born 1990), Ugandan singer, songwriter and producer
- Rema Svetlova, Armenian politician
- Gayatri Rema, Indian actress
- K. K. Rema, Indian politician
- Moses Isserles, or ReMA (1520–1572), Polish rabbi and talmudist

== Other uses ==
- Rema (moth)
- Rema (EP), 2019 eponymous extended play by Rema
- Rema language, a language of New Guinea
- Rema S. A., a Polish manufacturing company
- Reference Elevation Model of Antarctica (REMA)

== See also ==
- REMA 1000, a Norwegian supermarket chain
- Rema-Rema, an English music group
- Remas, a village and a former municipality in Albania
