= Grammy Award for Best African Music Performance =

Award presented by the Recording Academy

- Tyla is the most recent recipient for "Push 2 Start"
- Awarded for: Quality vocal or instrumental African music recordings (tracks or singles only)
- Country: South Africa
- Presented by: National Academy of Recording Arts and Sciences
- First award: 2024
- Currently held by: Tyla – "Push 2 Start" (2026)

Highlights
- Most wins: Tyla (2)
- Website: grammy.com

The Grammy Award for Best African Music Performance is an award presented by the Recording Academy to honor quality African music performances in any given year. The award was presented for the first time at the 66th Annual Grammy Awards in 2024, and is a sister category to the Best Global Music Performance award, following on from the creation of that category in 2022, and sits in the global genre field. The inaugural recipient of the award was Tyla, who won at the 66th Anual Grammy Awards for her song "Water".

The academy announced the new category in June 2023, stating that the award "recognizes recordings that utilize unique local expressions from across the African continent, highlighting regional melodic, harmonic and rhythmic musical traditions." The award honors, but is not limited to African popular music (Afro pop), genres.

The award recognizes recording that incorporate stylistic elements associates with African musical traditions and the African diaspora, including distinctive rhythmic structures and cultural influencers.

== Background ==
The category was created in order to amplify and expand the reach of African music and its creators and to celebrate the distinct, unique sounds of the continent. The Academy specifically cited the work of artists such as Davido, Libianca, Burna Boy, Wizkid, Rema, CKay, Wouter Kellerman, Tems, Zakes Bantwini, Tyler ICU and Nomcebo Zikode for highlighting African music on an international scale.

Regarding the establishment of this category, which was announced alongside Best Pop Dance Recording and Best Alternative Jazz Album, Recording Academy CEO Harvey Mason Jr. stated “The Recording Academy is proud to announce these latest category changes to our awards process. These changes reflect our commitment to actively listen and respond to the feedback from our music community, accurately represent a diverse range of relevant musical genres, and stay aligned with the ever-evolving musical landscape. By introducing these three new categories, we are able to acknowledge and appreciate a broader array of artists. We are excited to honor and celebrate the creators and recordings in these categories, while also exposing a wider range of music to fans worldwide.”

The Award was included as part of broader Grammy category changes intended to recognize a wider range of global music styles and to highlight the growing international influence of African music.

== Recipients ==
=== 2020s ===
Year	Artist	Work
2024
2024	Tyla	"Water"
2024	Asake and Olamide	"Amapiano"
2024	Burna Boy	"City Boys"
2024	Davido featuring Musa Keys	"Unavailable"
2024	Ayra Starr	"Rush"
2025
2025	Tems	"Love Me JeJe"
2025	Yemi Alade	"Tomorrow"
2025	Asake and Wizkid	"MMS"
2025	Chris Brown featuring Davido and Lojay	"Sensational"
2025	Burna Boy	"Higher"
2026
2026	Tyla	"Push 2 Start"
2026	Burna Boy	"Love"
2026	Davido featuring Omah Lay	"With You"
2026	Eddy Kenzo and Mehran Matin	"Hope & Love"
2026	Ayra Starr featuring Wizkid	"Gimme Dat"
2027
2027	Asake	"Gratitude"
2027	Angélique Kidjo featuring Ayra Starr	"Aye Kan (Are You Coming)"
2027	King Ayisoba	"No Tradition, No Africa"
2027	Tems	"Big Daddy"
2027	Asake & Wizkid	"Jogodo"

^{^[I]} Each year is linked to the article about the Grammy Awards held that year.

== Artists with multiple wins ==
2 wins

- Tyla

== Artists with multiple nominations ==
4 nominations

- Asake

3 nominations

- Ayra Starr
- Burna Boy
- Davido
- Wizkid

2 nominations

- Tems
- Tyla
- Wizkid
