= Emmanuel Mensah Agbeble =

Ghanaian-American photographer

Emmanuel Mensah Agbeble, known by his brand name APM World Mag or simply APM World (sometimes stylized as APMWORLD) is a Ghanaian-American photographer, filmmaker and creative director based in New York City. He is the recipient of the 2023 Ernie Paniccioli Award for Best Photographer of the Year which was organized by the Black Music Action Coalition.

== Biography ==
Agbeble was born into a family of creatives in Nima, Accra. Inspired by his father, a prominent Ghanaian photographer who owned a photographic studio in Ghana, Agbeble began his career at the age of 15.

He has directed creative works for artists including Burna Boy, Stonebwoy, Odumodublvck, Yemi Alade, Davido, Kwesi Arthur, Black Coffee, Asake, Lil Wayne, Wizkid, Rick Ross, Gyakie, Show Dem Camp, M.anifest, Fireboy, Black Sherif, Bnxn, Koffee, and Ruger. His works includes the Grammy-nominated album cover I Told Them... by Burna Boy, which was televised at the 2024 Grammy Awards event. And has been involved in various creative projects for the Schomburg Center for Research in Black Culture, the International Studio & Curatorial Program, NYC Labor Day Parade, Rolling Loud, NBA, Afropunk, Coachella, Governor's Ball Music Festival, NHL, AfroFuture and Afro Nation, amongst others.

Agbeble works has been featured in Rolling Stone, Flaunt Magazine, TIME, GhanaWeb, OkayAfrica, Yahoo! Sports, AOL, The Atlanta Journal-Constitution, Vulture, New York Public Library and others.
