= Gimme Dat (song) =

2025 single by Ayra Starr and Wizkid

Single by Ayra Starr and Wizkid
- Released: 15 April 2025
- Genre: Afrobeats
- Length: 3:44
- Label: Mavin; Republic
- Songwriters: Oyinkansola Aderibigbe; Ayodeji Balogun; Adekunle Oluwaseyi; Elvis Akujobi; Richard Imaekhai; Fred Daniels; Edafe Gabriel; Olusola Mayowa; Aniekeme Akpan; Jerry Duplessis; Katia Cadet; Mary Brown; Wyclef Jean
- Producers: Vybe0; Mikababeatz

Ayra Starr singles chronology
"All the Love" (2025)	"Gimme Dat" (2025)	"Hot Body" (2025)

Wizkid singles chronology
"Kese (Dance)" (2024)	"Gimme Dat" (2025)	"Kai!" (2025)

Music video
- "Gimme Dat" on YouTube

"Gimme Dat" is a song by Ayra Starr and Wizkid, released on 25 April 2025 through Mavin Records and Republic Records. Sampling Mary J. Blige and Wyclef Jean's 2000 single "911", the song marks Ayra Starr and Wizkid's second collaboration together. The song was later included on the track list of Starr's third album, Starr Girl (2026).

== Critical reception ==
"Gimme Dat" received positive reviews from music critics. Obed David of Premium Times wrote that the song was "backed with a groove-driven instrumental" as Ayra Starr led the verses and Wizkid raised the energy. He concluded that "An Ayra-Wizkid collaboration can never go wrong" and rated the song 9/10. Quincy of Ratings Game Music added that "Gimme Dat" was led by an "uptempo, funky Afrobeats beat that is guaranteed to get you moving, while still carrying an undeniable sensual undertone."

Zimiso Nyamande of The Music Review praised the two's chemistry on the song, calling "Gimme Dat" a "blend of Ayra’s fiery, youthful energy and Wizkid’s smooth, seasoned charm." Nyamande concluded that "Ayra Starr and Wizkid bring out the best in each other on the joint," saying the track stayed with the listener after it ended. A writer for The Beats of Africa wrote that the track was "an exercise in sophistication," praising the smooth production and Ayra Starr's vocal lead while noting debate around the pair's chemistry. It concluded that the song was "a beautiful, expertly crafted, yet slightly missed, opportunity."

=== Accolades ===
Year	Awards ceremony	Award description(s)	Results
2026	Grammy Awards	Best African Music Performance	Nominated

== Charts ==
Chart performance for "Gimme Dat"
Chart (2025)	Peak position
Nigeria Top 100 (TurnTable)	3
Suriname (Nationale Top 40)	6
UK Afrobeats Singles (OCC)	4
US Afrobeats Songs (Billboard)	8
US Rhythmic Airplay (Billboard)	31

== Release history ==
Release history and formats for "Gimme Dat"
Region	Date	Format	Label	Ref.
Various	25 April 2025	Streaming; digital download	Mavin; Republic	
