= Sability =

Single by Ayra Starr
- Released: 10 February 2023
- Genre: Afro pop
- Length: 2:46
- Label: Mavin
- Songwriters: Oyinkansola Sarah Aderibigbe; Oluwadamilare David Aderibigbe; Albert Williams Louis Longomba; Prince Oghenemine Omoferi; Kehinde Alabi; John John Ikponmwosa Ighodaro Ighodaro; Michael Ovie Hunter; Prosper Udu
- Producer: London

Ayra Starr singles chronology
"Rush" (2022)	"Sability" (2023)	"How Many Times" (2023)

Music video
- "Sability" on YouTube

"Sability" is a song by Nigerian singer Ayra Starr. It was released on 10 February 2023, and was written by Ayra Starr, her brother Dami, Mbryo, Louddaaa, Johnny Drille, London, and Prosper Udu. The song was produced by London, and features a sample of Awilo Longomba's "Coupe Bibamba." "Sability" was featured on Barack Obama's summer playlist in 2023. It was included on OkayAfrica's list of the "Best Afrobeats Songs of 2023."

== Reception ==
Tela Wangeci of The Native said "Sability" was "a potent reminder that we should have faith in our abilities, triumphs, and potential." Frank Ude of Doth Music wrote that the song leaned on London's production and Ayra Starr's "apathetic sass" to carry what he described as playful but scattered lyrics, calling the extra dramatic chorus "a miscalculated production choice." He concluded that the song was "fine for what it sets out to be," praising its fun tone and short runtime despite issues with the ending.

== Composition ==
Described by Ayra Starr herself as a "happy song," "Sability" maintains a relaxed and upbeat vibe with her referencing figures like Japanese footballer Shinji Kagawa. The song's verses are sung playfully, while the hook samples Awilo Longomba's "Coupé Bibamba". The Guardian noted that the hook contrasts with the overall tone of the song, potentially altering its intended effect.

== Music video ==
The music video for "Sability" was released on 19 February 2023. It was directed by Earthboi.

== Commercial performance ==
"Sability" debuted at No. 1 on the Official Nigeria Top 100 on 21 February 2023, earning 3.42 million on-demand streams and 38.3 million in radio reach during its first tracking week. This marked Ayra Starr's fourth chart-topping entry on the Top 100, following "Bloody Samaritan," "Rush," and "Won Da Mo," solidifying her position as the only female artist with multiple No. 1 songs in Nigeria at the time. In its second week, the song slipped to No. 2, overtaken by Bnxn's "Gwagwalada." Despite the dip, "Sability" remained a strong performer across streaming platforms, ranking No. 3 on the streaming chart with 2.36 million streams and achieving a radio reach of 42.6 million.

By 15 March 2023, "Sability" had dropped to No. 5 after spending one week at the summit. The song's decline continued in subsequent weeks, and by 29 March 2023, it had fallen to No. 7 on the chart. By April, it exited the Top 10, concluding its chart run after a notable debut and consistent performances across both streaming and radio platforms.

On 11 April 2024, Ayra Starr's track "Sability" reentered the Billboard U.S. Afrobeats Songs chart, taking the 47th spot. The song previously peaked at number 14, marking it as the sole entry on the chart for that week.

== Charts ==
=== Weekly charts ===
Chart performance for "Sability"
Chart (2023)	Peak position
Nigeria (TurnTable Top 100)	1
Suriname (Nationale Top 40)	6
US Afrobeats Songs (Billboard)	14
UK Afrobeats Singles (OCC)	2

=== Year-end charts ===
2023 year-end chart performance for "Sability"
Chart (2023)	Position
US Afrobeats Songs (Billboard)	27

== Certifications ==
Certifications for Sability
Region	Certification	Certified units/sales
Nigeria (TCSN)	Platinum	100,000^{‡}
^{‡} Sales+streaming figures based on certification alone.
