= Rush (Ayra Starr song) =

Single by Ayra Starr

from the album 19 & Dangerous
- Released: 16 September 2022
- Length: 3:05
- Label: Mavin
- Songwriters: Oyinkansola Sarah Aderibigbe; Prince Omoferi
- Producers: Hoops; Andre Vibez

Ayra Starr singles chronology
"Bloody Samaritan" (2021)	"Rush" (2022)	"Sability" (2023)

Music video
- "Rush" on YouTube

"Rush" is a song by Nigerian singer Ayra Starr, released as a single on 16 September 2022 by Mavin Records from her debut studio album 19 & Dangerous. The song was written by Starr and Prince Omoferi, and produced by Hoops and Andre Vibez.

After going viral on the video sharing service TikTok, "Rush" reached number 24 on the UK Singles Chart, and charted in the top 10 in France and South Africa, and the top 20 in Switzerland and the Netherlands. Prior to the song's success, Starr was cited by NME as one of their artists to watch in 2022, describing how she "varies her afro-pop sound perfectly by mixing in hints of R&B or trappy hit-hats". "Rush" earned Starr her first Grammy nomination at the 66th Annual Grammy Awards for Best African Music Performance.

== Composition and lyrics ==
"Rush" has been described by Ayra Starr as a reflection of momentum, gratitude and self-belief, written at a time when she felt her long-held goals were finally materialising, and released as part of the deluxe edition of 19 & Dangerous. The lyrics set boundaries against negativity and keep focus on work and prosperity, for example "Me no get the time for the hate and the bad energy", "I just dey my lane", and "You can’t count my grace", alongside refrains that attribute success to divine blessing ("Na God dey make my tap e dey rush"). The TG Omori directed music video reinforces these themes with confident performance and forward motion, pairing bright colour palettes and kinetic staging with Starr's assertive delivery.

== Charts ==
=== Weekly charts ===
Weekly chart performance
Chart (2023)	Peak position
Belgium (Ultratop 50 Wallonia)	16
Canada (Canadian Hot 100)	63
France (SNEP)	5
Global 200 (Billboard)	115
Hungary (Single Top 40)	18
Ireland (IRMA)	56
Lebanon (Lebanese Top 20)	3
Middle East and North Africa (IFPI)	18
Netherlands (Single Top 100)	17
South Africa Streaming (TOSAC)	6
Suriname (Nationale Top 40)	1
Sweden (Sverigetopplistan)	56
Switzerland (Schweizer Hitparade)	18
Turkey International Airplay (Radiomonitor Türkiye)	8
UK Singles (Official Charts)	24
UK Afrobeats (Official Charts)	1
UK Indie (Official Charts)	3
UK Hip Hop/R&B (Official Charts)	9

Weekly chart performance
Chart (2026)	Peak position
South Africa Airplay (TOSAC)	13

=== Year-end charts ===
Year-end chart performance for "Rush"
Chart (2023)	Position
Belgium (Ultratop 50 Wallonia)	27
Global Excl. US (Billboard)	167
Netherlands (Single Top 100)	22
Switzerland (Schweizer Hitparade)	22

== Certifications ==
Certifications for "Rush"
Region	Certification	Certified units/sales
Canada (Music Canada)	Platinum	80,000^{‡}
Denmark (IFPI Danmark)	Gold	45,000^{‡}
France (SNEP)	Diamond	333,333^{‡}
New Zealand (RMNZ)	Platinum	30,000^{‡}
Nigeria (TCSN)	3× Platinum	300,000^{‡}
Spain (Promusicae)	Gold	30,000^{‡}
United Kingdom (BPI)	Platinum	600,000^{‡}
^{‡} Sales+streaming figures based on certification alone.

== Release history ==
Release history and formats for "Rush"
Region	Date	Format	Label
Various	16 September 2022	Digital download; streaming	Mavin

== See also ==
- List of number-one songs of 2022 (Nigeria)
