= Who's Dat Girl =

Single by Ayra Starr

Single by Ayra Starr featuring Rema
- Released: 17 October 2025
- Genre: Afrodance; dancehall; R&B
- Length: 2:52
- Label: Mavin; Roc Nation
- Songwriters: Oyinkasola Sarah Aderibigbe; Nwamu Chukwudebem; Promise Ekpe; Divine Ikubor; Nilusu Nisanka
- Producers: Ragee; The Elements

Ayra Starr singles chronology
"Hot Body" (2025)	"Who's Dat Girl" (2025)	"On A Low" (2025)

Rema singles chronology
"Fun" (2025)	"Who's Dat Girl" (2025)	"Goals" (2026)

Music video
- "Who's Dat Girl" on YouTube

"Who's Dat Girl" is a song by Nigerian singer and songwriter Ayra Starr featuring fellow Nigerian singer, songwriter and rapper Rema. It was released on 17 October 2025, two months after Starr's "Hot Body". The song was later included on the track list of Starr's third album, Starr Girl (2026).

== Background and summary ==
The song blends elements of dancehall, Afrodance, and R&B. It marks Starr's third collaboration with Rema.

== Critical reception ==
That Grape Juice noted its blend of dancehall, R&B and "Middle Eastern sounds". RatingsGameMusic's Quincy complimented the "flaunting charm, wit, and undeniable chemistry" between Starr and Rema.

== Commercial performance ==
The song earned two million Spotify streams in its first five days. The music video earned one million views on YouTube in eight hours, making Starr the first Nigerian female artist to do so.

== Credits and personnel ==
Adapted from Tidal.

- Ayra Starr – vocals, composition
- Rema – vocals
- Johnny Driller – producer
- Leandro Hildago – producer
- Augusto Sanchez – producer
- Nwamu Chukwudebem – composition
- Promise Ekpe – composition
- Divine Ikubor – composition
- Nilusu Nisanka – composition

== Charts ==
Chart performance for "Who's Dat Girl"
Chart (2025)	Peak position
Honduras Anglo Airplay (Monitor Latino)	3
Nigeria (TurnTable Top 100)	2
UK Afrobeats (Official Charts)	1
US Afrobeats Songs (Billboard)	3
US World Digital Song Sales (Billboard)	9

== Certifications ==
Certifications for "Who's Dat Girl"
Region	Certification	Certified units/sales
Nigeria (TCSN)	Platinum	100,000^{‡}
^{‡} Sales+streaming figures based on certification alone.
