= Ragee =

Nigerian record producer

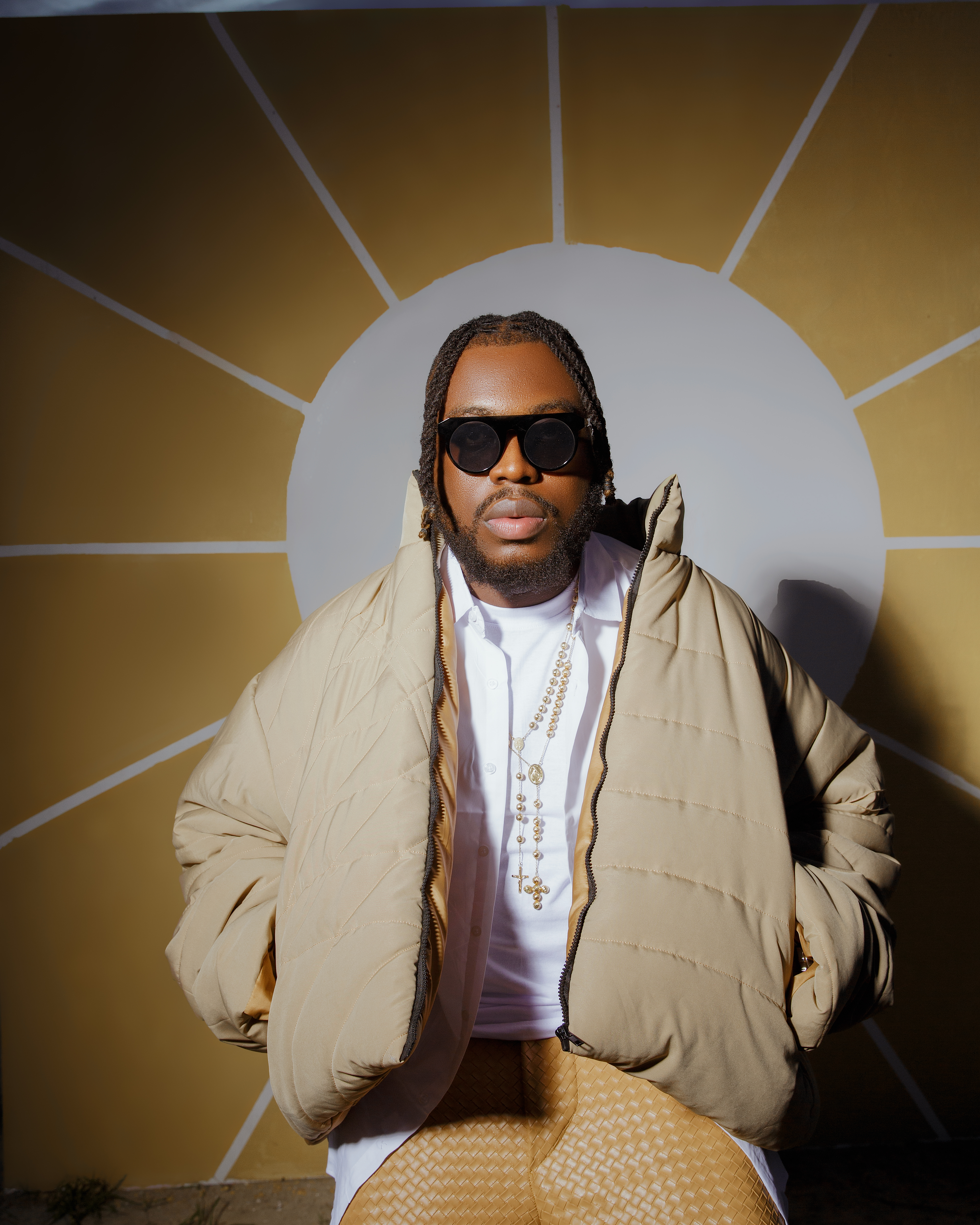

Background information
- Born: Ikechukwu Clinton Nnaemeka; 28 February 1997 (age 29); Lagos, Nigeria
- Origin: Anambra State
- Genres: Pop music; Afro pop music; Afropiano
- Occupation: Record producer
- Years active: 2018–present

Ikechukwu Clinton Nnaemeka (born 28 February 1997), professionally known as Ragee also known for the tag Initiating, Rage Process, is a Nigerian record producer and songwriter. He made his mainstream debut when he produced Davido’s hit song ”Unavailable” featuring Musa Keys off his fourth studio album Timeless (2023) which peaked at number 1 on the UK Afrobeats Singles Chart for five weeks and reached number 8 on the Billboard U.S. Afrobeats Songs chart.

== Early life ==
Ragee was born in Lagos, Nigeria and originally from Anambra State, He attended Lagos State Polytechnic Ikorodu, where he studied Computer Science. Ragee began his musical career in the choir and as a church drummer, He started as a rapper and songwriter before going into music production.

== Career ==
He first rose to prominence with his works on Bad Boy Timz’s ‘Have Fun’ in 2020, before producing Davido’s 2023 viral hit "Unavailable", featuring Musa keys. At the start of 2023, he formed a successful artist-producer combo with the Nigerian singer-songwriter Davido, as he went on producing two songs off his fourth studio album Timeless, Ragee has produced Nigerian music for the likes of Bad Boy Timz and rated among the 2022 top 10 Producers of 2022 according to Pulse Nigeria.

== Production discography ==
=== Singles produced ===
Artiste	Title	Reference
Bad Boy Timz	"Have Fun"	
Ayra Starr feat. Coco Jones, Anitta_(singer)	"Woman Commando"	
Davido feat. Musa Keys	"Unavailable"	
Davido feat. Logos Olori	"Picasso"	
Ayra Starr	"Commas"	
Young Jonn	"Stronger"	
Ayra Starr	"Hot Body"	
Young Jonn feat. Wizkid	"Cash Flow"	
