= Hypé =

Single by Aya Nakamura
- Released: 25 January 2024 (solo version); 7 March 2024 (featuring version)
- Recorded: 2023–2024
- Genre: Pop; zouk; compas
- Length: 2:28 (solo); 2:38 (featuring)
- Label: Nakamura Industrie; Rec. 118
- Songwriters: Aya Nakamura; Ayra Starr (featuring)
- Producer: Chef Bandit

Aya Nakamura singles chronology
"Daddy" (2023)	"Hypé" (2024)	"Avec classe" (2024)

Featuring

Ayra Starr singles chronology
"Commas" (2024)	"Hypé" (2024)	"Santa" (2024)

Music video
- "Hypé" on YouTube

"Hypé" is a song by French and Malian singer Aya Nakamura. It was released on 26 January 2024 through Nakamura Industrie and Rec. 118. A version with Ayra Starr was released on 7 March 2024.

== Charts ==
=== Weekly charts ===
Weekly chart performance for "Hypé"
Chart (2024)	Peak position
France (SNEP)	2
France Overseas Airplay (SNEP)	20
Switzerland (Schweizer Hitparade)	50
Turkey International Airplay (Radiomonitor Türkiye)	6

Weekly chart performance for "Hypé" with Ayra Starr
Chart (2024)	Peak position
UK Afrobeats (Official Charts)	17

=== Year-end charts ===
Year-end chart performance for "Hypé"
Chart (2024)	Position
France (SNEP)	56
