= The Year I Turned 21 =

2024 studio album by Ayra Starr

Studio album by Ayra Starr
- Released: 31 May 2024
- Genres: Afrobeats; R&B; pop; alté
- Length: 40:24
- Labels: Mavin; Republic
- Producers: Johnny Drille; El Zorro; Fwdslxsh; Jay Keys; Mike Hector; Kenobi; Kill September; London; Louddaaa; Marvey Muzique; Mystro Sugar; P2J; P.Priime; Ragee; Remdolla; Richard "M.R.I." McClashie; Rvssian; Sparrq

Ayra Starr chronology
19 & Dangerous (2021)	The Year I Turned 21 (2024)	Starr Girl (2026)

Singles from The Year I Turned 21
- 1. "Rhythm & Blues" Released: 13 September 2023; 2. "Commas" Released: 2 February 2024; 3. "Santa" Released: 4 April 2024

The Year I Turned 21 is the second studio album by Nigerian singer-songwriter Ayra Starr. It was released through Mavin and Republic Records on 31 May 2024. The album contains guest appearances from Asake, Anitta, Coco Jones, Giveon, Seyi Vibez, Rvssian, and Rauw Alejandro. It serves as the follow-up to her previous album, 19 & Dangerous (2021). The album debuted at number one in Nigeria.

== Background and release ==
Ayra Starr announced the title of her second studio album, "The Year I Turned 21", on 2 May 2024, along with its cover art and tracklist. The album was conceived during a period of personal growth and introspection. In an interview with Billboard, Starr revealed that the album was inspired by her experiences navigating adulthood, love, and self-discovery. The album was recorded over several months in 2022 and 2023, with production credits from notable producers such as London, Johnny Drille, and P.Priime. Starr drew inspiration from Afrobeats, R&B, and pop to create a unique sound reflecting her artistic evolution. The title "The Year I Turned 21" holds personal significance, as Starr turned 21 during the recording process. In an interview with Uproxx, she explained that the title represents a milestone birthday that marked a turning point in her life and career. The album was released on 31 May 2024 through Mavin Records. She stated in an interview with triple J that she grew inspiration from the grief she felt about losing her father, and on how she has never touched that kind of perspective before.

== Singles ==
The single "Rhythm and Blues" was released on 13 September 2023 as the first single from the album. Later, "Commas" was released on 2 February 2024, as the second single.

== Critical reception ==
Professional ratings
Review scores
Source	Rating
Clash	8/10
The Guardian	4/5 stars
NME	5/5 stars
The Native	8.1/10
Pitchfork	7.6/10
Pulse Nigeria	9.1/10

Tamil Makinde of NME stated that "Starr confidently blends genres, segueing from romantic deep cuts to emotional odes about her roots, produced by the likes of Louddaaa. She weaves a narrative thread through a collage of sounds with adept storytelling. In tracks like "Lagos Love Story", she flirts with reckless romance, while in "Last Heartbreak Song", an R&B-powered duet with Giveon, she finds the strength to move on. In "The Kids Are Alright", she weaves intergenerational conversations, and each track radiates a clear vision". Kadish Morris of The Guardian gave the album 4/5 stars, praising Starr's vocal range and experimentation with various sounds and cadences, stating: "Here, she puts that big voice to work. Adeayo Adebiyi of Pulse Nigeria gave the album a 9.1/10 rating, stating that "The Year I Turned 21" is an accomplished sophomore effort that excels in all aspects, showcasing Ayra Starr's confidence and superior talent.

== Track listing ==
The Year I Turned 21 track listing
No.	Title	Lyrics	Music	Producer(s)	Length
1.	"Bird Sing of Money"	Oyinkansola Sarah Aderigbigbe	O. S. Aderigbigbe; Manson Tanner; Michael Ovie Hunter	London; Marvey Muzique	2:42
2.	"Goodbye (Warm Up)" (with Asake)	O. S. Aderigbigbe; Ahmed Ololade	O. S. Aderigbigbe; Ololade; Douglas Ford; Richard Olowaranti Mbu Isong	P2J	2:43
3.	"Commas"	O. S. Aderigbigbe; Prince Omoferi	O. S. Aderigbigbe; Omoferi; Nnaemeka Ikechukwu Clinton	Ragee; London^{[a]}; Aod^{[a]}	2:37
4.	"Woman Commando" (with Anitta and Coco Jones)	O. S. Aderigbigbe; Courtney Michaela Jones; Larissa de Macedo Machado; Nwamu Francis Chukwudubem	O. S. Aderigbigbe; Andy Bauza; Jones; De Macedo Machado; Chukwudubem; Clinton	Ragee	3:28
5.	"Control"	O. S. Aderigbigbe; Emmanuel Isong	O. S. Aderigbigbe; Isong; Tanner; Hunter	London; Jay Keys; AOD	2:33
6.	"Lagos Love Story"	S. Aderigbigbe	O. S. Aderigbigbe; Hunter	London; Off n Out^{[a]}	2:35
7.	"Rhythm & Blues"	O. S. Aderigbigbe	O. S. Aderigbigbe; Ayomikun Emmanuel Aro; Uzoma Samuel Onyenucheya	Sparrq	2:23
8.	"21"	O. S. Aderigbigbe; Adeyinka Bankole; Leon Thomas	O. S. Aderigbigbe; Bankole; L. Thomas; Tanner; Mike Hector; Tomi Mikael Mannonen	Fwdslxsh; Kill September; Hector	2:22
9.	"Last Heartbreak Song" (with Giveon)	O. S. Aderigbigbe; Giveon Evans; Omoferi	O. S. Aderigbigbe; Evans; Omoferi; Kehinde Alabi	Louddaaa	2:29
10.	"Bad Vibes" (with Seyi Vibez)	O. S. Aderigbigbe; Oluwaloseyi Afolobi Balogun	O. S. Aderigbigbe; Michael; Tanner; Balogun; Ajayi Olusegun Michael	Mystro Sugar; Ikenna Ohaeri^{[a]}	2:48
11.	"Orun"	O. S. Aderigbigbe; Omoferi	O. S. Aderigbigbe; Kehinde Alabi; Omoferi	Louddaaa; Godwyn Guitar^{[a]}	2:37
12.	"Jazzy's Song"	O. S. Aderigbigbe; Michael Collins Ajereh; Oluwadamilare Aderigbigbe	O. S. Aderigbigbe; Ajereh; Chukwudubem; O. Aderigbigbe; Oredope Peace; Ekpe	P.Priime	2:14
13.	"1942" (with Milar)	O. S. Aderigbigbe; O. Aderigbigbe	O. S. Aderigbigbe; John Ighodaro; O. Aderigbigbe	Johnny Drille	2:26
14.	"The Kids Are Alright"	S. Aderigbigbe	O. S. Aderigbigbe; Remy Jones	Remdolla	3:14
15.	"Santa" (with Rauw Alejandro and Rvssian)	O. S. Aderigbigbe; Chukwudubem; O. Aderigbigbe; Oswaldo Rangel; Raúl Alejandro Ocasio	O. S. Aderigbigbe; Jorge PizarroKelvin Thomas; Kilian Johnston; Lucas Sikidila; Nathalia Marshall; Chukwudubem; O. Aderigbigbe; Rangel; Alejandro Ocasio; Richard McClashie	Rvssian; Richard "M.R.I." McClashie; Kenobi; El Zorro	3:13
Total length:					40:24

Note

- ^{^[a]} signifies an additional producer

== Personnel ==
Musicians

- Ayra Starr – vocals
- Asake – vocals (track 2)
- Anitta – vocals (track 4)
- Coco Jones – vocals (track 4)
- Prosper Agha Odu – guitar (track 9)
- Giveon – vocals (track 9)
- Ufot Godwin – guitar (track 11)
- Femi Olawoyin – violin (track 11)
- Milar – vocals (track 13)
- Rauw Alejandro – vocals (track 15)

Technical

- Johnny Drille – mixing (all tracks), engineering (tracks 3, 7, 13, 14)
- Chris Gehringer – mastering (track 15)
- London – engineering (tracks 1, 6)
- Marvey Again – engineering (tracks 1, 4, 8, 14)
- Marelenius – engineering (track 2)
- Jake Prein – engineering (track 4)
- Wonda – engineering (track 8)
- Louddaaa – engineering (tracks 9, 11)
- Kenobi – engineering (track 15)
- Rvssian – engineering (track 15)

== Accolades ==
Awards and nominations for The Year I Turned 21
Organization	Year	Category	Result	Ref.
African Entertainment Awards USA	2024	Album of the Year	Nominated	

== Charts ==
Chart performance for The Year I Turned 21
Chart (2024)	Peak position
Canadian Albums (Billboard)	89
French Albums (SNEP)	72
Nigerian Albums (TurnTable)	1
UK Albums (Official Charts)	80
US Billboard 200	195
US World Albums (Billboard)	4
