= Big FU =

2023 single by David Guetta

Single by David Guetta, Ayra Starr, Lil Durk
- Released: 27 October 2023
- Genre: House, Afrobeats; Hip house
- Length: 2:41
- Label: Warner Music
- Songwriters: Oyinkansola Sarah, Derrick Banks
- Producers: David Guetta, Johnny Goldstein

David Guetta singles chronology
"On My Love" (2023)	"Big FU" (2023)	"When We Were Young (The Logical Song)" (2023)

Ayra Starr singles chronology
"You're Hired" (2023)	"Big FU" (2023)	"Commas" (2024)

Lil Durk singles chronology
"Guitar in My Room" (2023)	"Big FU" (2023)	"Smurk Carter" (2023)

"Big FU" is a song by French DJ David Guetta, Nigerian singer Ayra Starr and American rapper Lil Durk. It reached No. 23 on Billboard U.S. Afrobeats Songs and No. 18 on New Zealand Top 40 charts.

== Background and release ==
The house, funk and afrobeats influenced single "Big FU" was released on 27 October 2023. It was produced by David Guetta and Johnny Goldstein. The expression "Big FU" represents a middle finger. The music video was released on 29 November 2023.
