= Santa (song) =

Single by Rvssian, Rauw Alejandro and Ayra Starr

from the album The Year I Turned 21
- Language: Spanish; English
- English title: "Saint"
- Released: 4 April 2024
- Length: 3:13
- Label: Sony Latin; Head Concussion
- Songwriters: Jorge Pizarro "Kenobi"; Nathalia Marshall; Lucas Sikidila; Oluwadamilare Aderibigbe; Nwamu Francis Chukwudubem; Oswaldo Rangel "Dinay"; Kevin Thomas "King Kosa"; Kilian Johnston; Oyinkansola Sarah Aderibigbe "Ayra Starr"; Raul Alejandro Ocasio "Rauw Alejandro"; Richard McClashie "M.R.l."
- Producers: Kenobi; El Zorro; Rvssian; M.R.I.

Rvssian singles chronology
"Tropicana" (2023)	"Santa" (2024)	"Choppa" (2024)

Rauw Alejandro singles chronology
"La Nena" (2024)	"Santa" (2024)	"Espectacular" (2024)

Ayra Starr singles chronology
"Hypé" (2024)	"Santa" (2024)	"All the Love" (2024)

Music video
- "Santa" on YouTube

"Santa" (transl. "Saint") is a song produced by Jamaican record producer Rvssian and recorded by Puerto Rican singer Rauw Alejandro and Nigerian singer Ayra Starr. It was written by Kenobi, Nathalia Marshall, Lucas Sikidila, Oluwadamilare Aderibigbe, Nwamu Francis Chukwudubem, Dinay, King Kosa, Kilian Johnston, Starr, Alejandro, and M.R.l., while the production was handled by Kenobi, Alejandro, Rvssian, and M.R.I.. The song was released for digital download and streaming as a single by Sony Music Latin and Head Concussion Records on 4 April 2024. It was also released for Rauw Alejandro's sixth studio album, Cosa Nuestra: Capítulo 0, on 26 September 2025.

== Charts ==
=== Weekly charts ===
Weekly peak performance for "Santa"
Chart (2024)	Peak position
Argentina Hot 100 (Billboard)	11
Bolivia (Billboard)	1
Central America + Caribbean (FONOTICA)	2
Colombia (Billboard)	2
Chile (Billboard)	7
Ecuador (Billboard)	2
Global 200 (Billboard)	24
Italy (FIMI)	46
Mexico (Billboard)	15
Panama (PRODUCE)	5
Peru (Billboard)	1
Portugal (AFP)	50
Spain (Promusicae)	1
Switzerland (Schweizer Hitparade)	38
US Bubbling Under Hot 100 (Billboard)	5
US Hot Latin Songs (Billboard)	7
US Latin Airplay (Billboard)	25
US Latin Rhythm Airplay (Billboard)	7

=== Year-end charts ===
Year-end chart performance for "Santa"
Chart (2024)	Position
Global 200 (Billboard)	140
US Hot Latin Songs (Billboard)	20

Year-end chart performance for "Santa"
Chart (2025)	Position
Central America Airplay (Monitor Latino)	57

== Certifications ==
Certifications and sales for "Santa"
Region	Certification	Certified units/sales
Mexico (AMPROFON)	4× Platinum	560,000^{‡}
Spain (Promusicae)	5× Platinum	300,000^{‡}
United States (RIAA)	16× Platinum (Latin)	960,000^{‡}
^{‡} Sales+streaming figures based on certification alone.

== See also ==
- List of best-selling singles in Spain
