= Nationale Top 40 Suriname =

Weekly record chart

Nationale Top 40 Suriname is a weekly record chart in Suriname. It is updated every Thursday by the Natio40 Foundation (Dutch: Stichting Natio40).

== Background ==
The first Top 40 appeared on April 12, 2013. It is based on radio airplay, music store sales, and reports from the Association of DJ's in Suriname. In its first years, the foundation also kept track of specific genres such as the Hindi Top 3, Pop Jawa top 3, Gospel/Inspirational Top 3, Maroon Top 3 and Bigi Poku/Kaseko/Kawina/Kabula Top 3; it even published a monthly TBL Box Office Top 3, presenting the 3 best-attended movies. The Top 40 was covered in a weekly column from October 2013 to May 2016 on the online news portal Starnieuws.

Both domestic and foreign songs have topped the Nationale Top 40. The single "Perfume" by Prince Koloni, later winning a "Song of the Year" award, was the #1 song for five weeks in 2015. "Beleki Beketje" by the Ghetto Crew, which gained popularity as an online dance challenge, hit #1 in 2019. Many Surinamese Dutch musicians have had #1 hits as well; Kenny B has been the most successful as of March 2019 with 11 hits.
