= UK Afrobeats Singles Chart =

UK record chart

UK Afrobeats Songs charts
- Purpose: To rank the most popular Afrobeat and Afroswing songs weekly
- Owner: OCC; Afro Nation

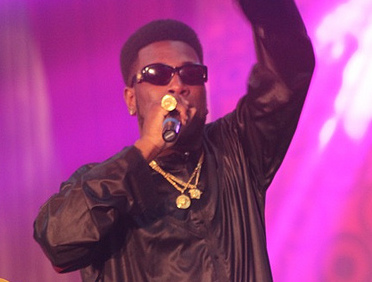
Burna Boy has had twelve number ones in the 2020s.

The UK Afrobeats Singles Chart is a record chart compiled in the United Kingdom by the Official Charts Company (OCC) to determine the 20 most popular singles in the afrobeats and afroswing genres. The chart is compiled by the OCC from digital downloads, physical record sales and audio streams in UK retail outlets. The chart was launched for the first time in 2020, with the first chart being revealed on BBC Radio 1Xtra on 26 July 2020, and was published on the Official Charts website.

The introduction of the chart came about due to the rising popularity of afrobeats music and artists in the United Kingdom.

As of January 2025, the act with most number one appearances in the chart is Burna Boy with eleven appearances, "Real Life", "Ginger" (as featuring with Wizkid), "Kilometre", "Want It All", "B D'or", "Last Last", "For My Hand", "Alone", "Sittin' on Top of the World", "Cheat on Me", "City Boys" and "Bundle by Bundle".

== Number ones ==
=== 2020 ===
Issue date	Single	Artist(s)	Record label(s)	Ref.
1 August	"Grandad"	NSG	NSG	
8 August	"Lupita"	NSG	NSG	
15 August	"Jerusalema"	Master KG featuring Nomcebo Zikode	Elektra	
22 August	"Jerusalema"	Master KG featuring Nomcebo Zikode	Elektra	
29 August	"Real Life"	Burna Boy featuring Stormzy	Atlantic	
5 September	"Real Life"	Burna Boy featuring Stormzy	Atlantic	
12 September	"Real Life"	Burna Boy featuring Stormzy	Atlantic	
19 September	"Real Life"	Burna Boy featuring Stormzy	Atlantic	
26 September	"Jerusalema"	Master KG featuring Nomcebo Zikode	Elektra	
3 October	"Jerusalema"	Master KG featuring Nomcebo Zikode	Elektra	
10 October	"Jerusalema"	Master KG featuring Nomcebo Zikode	Elektra	
17 October	"Jerusalema"	Master KG featuring Nomcebo Zikode	Elektra	
24 October	"Jerusalema"	Master KG featuring Nomcebo Zikode	Elektra	
31 October	"Jerusalema"	Master KG featuring Nomcebo Zikode	Elektra	
7 November	"Real Life"	Burna Boy featuring Stormzy	Atlantic	
14 November	"Ginger"	Wizkid featuring Burna Boy	Columbia	
21 November	"Ginger"	Wizkid featuring Burna Boy	Columbia	
28 November	"Cut Me Off"	Yxng Bane featuring D-Block Europe	Disturbing London/Parlophone	
5 December	"Cut Me Off"	Yxng Bane featuring D-Block Europe	Disturbing London/Parlophone	
12 December	"Cut Me Off"	Yxng Bane featuring D-Block Europe	Disturbing London/Parlophone	
19 December	"Cut Me Off"	Yxng Bane featuring D-Block Europe	Disturbing London/Parlophone	
26 December	"Cut Me Off"	Yxng Bane featuring D-Block Europe	Disturbing London/Parlophone	

=== 2021 ===
Issue date	Single	Artist(s)	Record label(s)	Ref.
2 January	"Cut Me Off"	Yxng Bane featuring D-Block Europe	Disturbing London/Parlophone	
9 January	"Cut Me Off"	Yxng Bane featuring D-Block Europe	Disturbing London/Parlophone	
16 January	"Cut Me Off"	Yxng Bane featuring D-Block Europe	Disturbing London/Parlophone	
23 January	"Ginger"	Wizkid featuring Burna Boy	Columbia	
30 January	"Ginger"	Wizkid featuring Burna Boy	Columbia	
6 February	"Essence"	Wizkid featuring Tems	Columbia	
13 February	"Essence"	Wizkid featuring Tems	Columbia	
20 February	"Essence"	Wizkid featuring Tems	Columbia	
27 February	"Essence"	Wizkid featuring Tems	Columbia	
6 March	"Essence"	Wizkid featuring Tems	Columbia	
13 March	"Drunk Guitar"	NSG	NSG	
20 March	"Drunk Guitar"	NSG	NSG	
27 March	"Drunk Guitar"	NSG	NSG	
3 April	"Dimension"	Jae5 featuring Skepta & Rema	Black Butter	
10 April	"Dimension"	Jae5 featuring Skepta & Rema	Black Butter	
17 April	"Dimension"	Jae5 featuring Skepta & Rema	Black Butter	
24 April	"Dimension"	Jae5 featuring Skepta & Rema	Black Butter	
1 May	"Dimension"	Jae5 featuring Skepta & Rema	Black Butter	
8 May	"Dimension"	Jae5 featuring Skepta & Rema	Black Butter	
15 May	"Kilometre"	Burna Boy	Atlantic	
22 May	"Dimension"	Jae5 featuring Skepta & Rema	Black Butter	
29 May	"Dimension"	Jae5 featuring Skepta & Rema	Black Butter	
5 June	"Dimension"	Jae5 featuring Skepta & Rema	Black Butter	
12 June	"She Like"	Darkoo featuring Blanco	Atlantic	
19 June	"Dimension"	Jae5 featuring Skepta & Rema	Black Butter	
26 June	"Dimension"	Jae5 featuring Skepta & Rema	Black Butter	
3 July	"Birthday"	Yxng Bane featuring Stefflon Don	Parlophone	
10 July	"Bounce"	S1mba, Tion Wayne and Stay Flee	Parlophone	
17 July	"Bounce"	S1mba, Tion Wayne and Stay Flee	Parlophone	
24 July	"Bounce"	S1mba, Tion Wayne and Stay Flee	Parlophone	
31 July	"Ride"	MoStack	EMI	
7 August	"System"	Dave featuring Wizkid	Dave Neighbourhood	
14 August	"System"	Dave featuring Wizkid	Dave Neighbourhood	
21 August	"System"	Dave featuring Wizkid	Dave Neighbourhood	
28 August	"System"	Dave featuring Wizkid	Dave Neighbourhood	
4 September	"System"	Dave featuring Wizkid	Dave Neighbourhood	
11 September	"System"	Dave featuring Wizkid	Dave Neighbourhood	
18 September	"System"	Dave featuring Wizkid	Dave Neighbourhood	
25 September	"Petite"	NSG	NSG	
2 October	"Found"	Tems featuring Brent Faiyaz	Since 93	
9 October	"Peru"	Fireboy DML	Ybnl Nation	
16 October	"Want It All"	Burna Boy featuring Polo G	Atlantic	
23 October	"Peru"	Fireboy DML	Ybnl Nation	
30 October	"Peru"	Fireboy DML	Ybnl Nation	
6 November	"Peru"	Fireboy DML	Ybnl Nation	
13 November	"Mood"	Wizkid featuring BuJu	RCA/Starboy	
20 November	"Mood"	Wizkid featuring BuJu	RCA/Starboy	
27 November	"Don't Play Me"	Shaybo & NSG	Black Butter	
4 December	"Mood"	Wizkid featuring BuJu	RCA/Starboy	
11 December	"Only God Can Judge Me"	NSG featuring Mist	NSG	
18 December	"Only God Can Judge Me"	NSG featuring Mist	NSG	
25 December	"Headliner"	NSG	NSG	

=== 2022 ===
Issue date	Single	Artist(s)	Record label(s)	Ref.
15 January	"B D'or"	Burna Boy featuring Wizkid	Atlantic	
22 January	"B D'or"	Burna Boy featuring Wizkid	Atlantic	
29 January	"Emiliana"	CKay	Parlophone	
5 February	"Emiliana"	CKay	Parlophone	
12 February	"Emiliana"	CKay	Parlophone	
19 February	"Emiliana"	CKay	Parlophone	
26 February	"Emiliana"	CKay	Parlophone	
5 March	"Emiliana"	CKay	Parlophone	
12 March	"Emiliana"	CKay	Parlophone	
19 March	"Finesse"	Pheelz and Buju	Riidiimacool	
26 March	"Finesse"	Pheelz and Buju	Riidiimacool	
2 April	"Finesse"	Pheelz and Buju	Riidiimacool	
9 April	"Finesse"	Pheelz and Buju	Riidiimacool	
16 April	"Finesse"	Pheelz and Buju	Riidiimacool	
23 April	"Finesse"	Pheelz and Buju	Riidiimacool	
30 April	"Finesse"	Pheelz and Buju	Riidiimacool	
7 May	"Finesse"	Pheelz and Buju	Riidiimacool	
14 May	"Finesse"	Pheelz and Buju	Riidiimacool	
21 May	"Finesse"	Pheelz and Buju	Riidiimacool	
28 May	"Last Last"	Burna Boy	Atlantic	
3 June	"Last Last"	Burna Boy	Atlantic	
10 June	"Last Last"	Burna Boy	Atlantic	
17 June	"Last Last"	Burna Boy	Atlantic	
24 June	"Last Last"	Burna Boy	Atlantic	
1 July	"Last Last"	Burna Boy	Atlantic	
8 July	"Last Last"	Burna Boy	Atlantic	
15 July	"Last Last"	Burna Boy	Atlantic	
22 July	"Last Last"	Burna Boy	Atlantic	
29 July	"Last Last"	Burna Boy	Atlantic	
5 August	"Last Last"	Burna Boy	Atlantic	
12 August	"Last Last"	Burna Boy	Atlantic	
19 August	"Last Last"	Burna Boy	Atlantic	
26 August	"For My Hand"	Burna Boy featuring Ed Sheeran	Atlantic	
3 September	"For My Hand"	Burna Boy featuring Ed Sheeran	Atlantic	
10 September	"For My Hand"	Burna Boy featuring Ed Sheeran	Atlantic	
17 September	"For My Hand"	Burna Boy featuring Ed Sheeran	Atlantic	
24 September	"For My Hand"	Burna Boy featuring Ed Sheeran	Atlantic	
1 October	"For My Hand"	Burna Boy featuring Ed Sheeran	Atlantic	
8 October	"For My Hand"	Burna Boy featuring Ed Sheeran	Atlantic	
15 October	"For My Hand"	Burna Boy featuring Ed Sheeran	Atlantic	
22 October	"Propeller"	Jae5 featuring Dave and BNXN	Black Butter	
29 October	"Propeller"	Jae5 featuring Dave and BNXN	Black Butter	
5 November	"Propeller"	Jae5 featuring Dave and BNXN	Black Butter	
12 November	"Money & Love"	Wizkid	RCA/Starboy	
19 November	"Rush"	Ayra Starr	Mavin	
26 November	"Alone"	Burna Boy	Def Jam/Hollywood/Roc Nation	
3 December	"Alone"	Burna Boy	Def Jam/Hollywood/Roc Nation	
10 December	"Alone"	Burna Boy	Def Jam/Hollywood/Roc Nation	
17 December	"Alone"	Burna Boy	Def Jam/Hollywood/Roc Nation	
24 December	"Alone"	Burna Boy	Def Jam/Hollywood/Roc Nation	
31 December	"Alone"	Burna Boy	Def Jam/Hollywood/Roc Nation	

=== 2023 ===
Issue date	Single	Artist(s)	Record label(s)	Ref.
7 January	"Alone"	Burna Boy	Def Jam/Hollywood/Roc Nation	
14 January	"Alone"	Burna Boy	Def Jam/Hollywood/Roc Nation	
21 January	"People"	Libianca	5K	
28 January	"People"	Libianca	5K	
4 February	"People"	Libianca	5K	
11 February	"People"	Libianca	5K	
18 February	"People"	Libianca	5K	
25 February	"People"	Libianca	5K	
4 March	"People"	Libianca	5K	
11 March	"People"	Libianca	5K	
18 March	"People"	Libianca	5K	
25 March	"People"	Libianca	5K	
1 April	"People"	Libianca	5K	
8 April	"People"	Libianca	5K	
15 April	"Unavailable"	Davido/Musa Keys	Columbia	
22 April	"Unavailable"	Davido/Musa Keys	Columbia	
29 April	"Unavailable"	Davido/Musa Keys	Columbia	
6 May	"Unavailable"	Davido/Musa Keys	Columbia	
13 May	"Soweto"	Victony/Rema/Tempoe	Encore	
20 May	"Soweto"	Victony/Rema/Tempoe	Encore	
27 May	"Soweto"	Victony/Rema/Tempoe	Encore	
3 June	"Soweto"	Victony/Rema/Tempoe	Encore	
10 June	"Unavailable"	Davido/Musa Keys	Columbia	
17 June	"Sittin' on Top of the World"	Burna Boy	Atlantic	
24 June	"Who Told You"	J Hus and Drake	Black Butter/OVO/Republic	
1 July	"Who Told You"	J Hus and Drake	Black Butter/OVO/Republic	
8 July	"Who Told You"	J Hus and Drake	Black Butter/OVO/Republic	
15 July	"Who Told You"	J Hus and Drake	Black Butter/OVO/Republic	
22 July	"Who Told You"	J Hus and Drake	Black Butter/OVO/Republic	
29 July	"Who Told You"	J Hus and Drake	Black Butter/OVO/Republic	
5 August	"Who Told You"	J Hus and Drake	Black Butter/OVO/Republic	
12 August	"Who Told You"	J Hus and Drake	Black Butter/OVO/Republic	
19 August	"Who Told You"	J Hus and Drake	Black Butter/OVO/Republic	
26 August	"Who Told You"	J Hus and Drake	Black Butter/OVO/Republic	
2 September	"Who Told You"	J Hus and Drake	Black Butter/OVO/Republic	
9 September	"Cheat on Me"	Burna Boy featuring Dave	Atlantic	
16 September	"Cheat on Me"	Burna Boy featuring Dave	Atlantic	
23 September	"City Boys"	Burna Boy	Atlantic	
30 September	"City Boys"	Burna Boy	Atlantic	
7 October	"Water"	Tyla	Epic/Fax	
14 October	"Water"	Tyla	Epic/Fax	
21 October	"Water"	Tyla	Epic/Fax	
28 October	"Water"	Tyla	Epic/Fax	
4 November	"Water"	Tyla	Epic/Fax	
11 November	"Water"	Tyla	Epic/Fax	
18 November	"Water"	Tyla	Epic/Fax	
25 November	"Water"	Tyla	Epic/Fax	
2 December	"Water"	Tyla	Epic/Fax	
9 December	Me & U	Tems	Since '93/RCA	
16 December	Me & U	Tems	Since '93/RCA	
23 December	Me & U	Tems	Since '93/RCA	
30 December	Me & U	Tems	Since '93/RCA	

=== 2024 ===
Issue date	Single	Artist(s)	Record label(s)	Ref.
6 January	"Me & U"	Tems	RCA/Since '93	
13 January	"Me & U"	Tems	RCA/Since '93	
20 January	"This Year (Blessings)"	Victor Thompson/Ehis DGreatest	300 Entertainment/Epic	
27 January	"Truth or Dare"	Tyla	Fax/Epic	
3 February	"Truth or Dare"	Tyla	Fax/Epic	
10 February	"Twe Twe"	Kizz Daniel and Davido	Flyboi Inc./Empire	
17 February	"Commas"	Ayra Starr	Republic	
24 February	"Commas"	Ayra Starr	Republic	
2 March	"Truth or Dare"	Tyla	Fax/Epic	
9 March	"Truth or Dare"	Tyla	Fax/Epic	
16 March	"Commas"	Ayra Starr	Republic	
23 March	"Commas"	Ayra Starr	Republic	
30 March	"Commas"	Ayra Starr	Republic	
6 April	"Jump"	Tyla with Gunna and Skillibeng	Fax/Epic	
13 April	"Jump"	Tyla with Gunna and Skillibeng	Fax/Epic	
20 April	"Jump"	Tyla with Gunna and Skillibeng	Fax/Epic	
27 April	"Jump"	Tyla with Gunna and Skillibeng	Fax/Epic	
4 May	"Jump"	Tyla with Gunna and Skillibeng	Fax/Epic	
11 May	"Jump"	Tyla with Gunna and Skillibeng	Fax/Epic	
18 May	"Jump"	Tyla with Gunna and Skillibeng	Fax/Epic	
25 May	"Love Me JeJe"	Tems	RCA/Since '93	
1 June	"Love Me JeJe"	Tems	RCA/Since '93	
8 June	"Love Me JeJe"	Tems	RCA/Since '93	
15 June	"Love Me JeJe"	Tems	RCA/Since '93	
22 June	"Love Me JeJe"	Tems	RCA/Since '93	
29 June	"Love Me JeJe"	Tems	RCA/Since '93	
6 July	"Wave"	Asake featuring Central Cee	Empire/Ybnl Nation/Columbia	
13 July	"Love Me JeJe"	Tems	RCA/Since '93	
20 July	"Love Me JeJe"	Tems	RCA/Since '93	
27 July	"Love Me JeJe"	Tems	RCA/Since '93	
3 August	"Love Me JeJe"	Tems	RCA/Since '93	
10 August	"Wave"	Asake featuring Central Cee	Empire/Ybnl Nation/Columbia	
17 August	"Wave"	Asake featuring Central Cee	Empire/Ybnl Nation/Columbia	
24 August	"Active"	Asake and Travis Scott	Ybnl Nation	
31 August	"Active"	Asake and Travis Scott	Ybnl Nation	
7 September	"Active"	Asake and Travis Scott	Ybnl Nation	
14 September	"Active"	Asake and Travis Scott	Ybnl Nation	
21 September	"Active"	Asake and Travis Scott	Ybnl Nation	
28 September	"Active"	Asake and Travis Scott	Ybnl Nation	
5 October	"Active"	Asake and Travis Scott	Ybnl Nation	
12 October	"Active"	Asake and Travis Scott	Ybnl Nation	
19 October	"MMS"	Asake and Wizkid	Ybnl Nation	
26 October	"Push 2 Start"	Tyla	Fax/Epic	
2 November	"Piece of My Heart"	Wizkid featuring Brent Faiyaz	RCA/Starboy	
9 November	"Piece of My Heart"	Wizkid featuring Brent Faiyaz	RCA/Starboy	
16 November	"Piece of My Heart"	Wizkid featuring Brent Faiyaz	RCA/Starboy	
23 November	"Push 2 Start"	Tyla	Fax/Epic	
30 November	"Kese (Dance)"	Wizkid	Columbia	
7 December	"Push 2 Start"	Tyla	Fax/Epic	
14 December	"Push 2 Start"	Tyla	Fax/Epic	
21 December	"Push 2 Start"	Tyla	Fax/Epic	
28 December	"Push 2 Start"	Tyla	Fax/Epic	

=== 2025 ===
Issue date	Single	Artist(s)	Record label(s)	Ref.
4 January	"Push 2 Start"	Tyla	Fax/Epic	
11 January	"Push 2 Start"	Tyla	Fax/Epic	
18 January	"Push 2 Start"	Tyla	Fax/Epic	
25 January	"Bundle by Bundle"	Burna Boy	Spaceship	
1 February	"Bundle by Bundle"	Burna Boy	Spaceship	
8 February	"Bundle by Bundle"	Burna Boy	Spaceship	
15 February	"Bundle by Bundle"	Burna Boy	Spaceship	
22 February	"Baby (Is It a Crime)"	Rema	Interscope/Marvin	
1 March	"Baby (Is It a Crime)"	Rema	Interscope/Marvin	
8 March	"Baby (Is It a Crime)"	Rema	Interscope/Marvin	
15 March	"Baby (Is It a Crime)"	Rema	Interscope/Marvin	
22 March	"Baby (Is It a Crime)"	Rema	Interscope/Marvin	
29 March	"Baby (Is It a Crime)"	Rema	Interscope/Marvin	
5 April	"Shake it to the Max (FLY)"	Moliy/Silent Addy	Gamma	
12 April	"Shake it to the Max (FLY)"	Moliy/Silent Addy	Gamma	
19 April	"Shake it to the Max (FLY)"	Moliy/Silent Addy	Gamma	
26 April	"Shake it to the Max (FLY)"	Moliy/Silent Addy	Gamma	
3 May	"Shake it to the Max (FLY)"	Moliy/Silent Addy	Gamma	
10 May	"Shake it to the Max (FLY)"	Moliy/Silent Addy	Gamma	
17 May	"Shake it to the Max (FLY)"	Moliy/Silent Addy	Gamma	
24 May	"Shake it to the Max (FLY)"	Moliy/Silent Addy	Gamma	
31 May	"Shake it to the Max (FLY)"	Moliy/Silent Addy	Gamma	
7 June	"Shake it to the Max (FLY)"	Moliy/Silent Addy	Gamma	
14 June	"With You"	Davido featuring Omah Lay	Columbia	
21 June	"With You"	Davido featuring Omah Lay	Columbia	
28 June	"With You"	Davido featuring Omah Lay	Columbia	
5 July	"With You"	Davido featuring Omah Lay	Columbia	
12 July	"Gold"	J Hus featuring Asake	Milter Records/Empire	
19 July	"Gold"	J Hus featuring Asake	Milter Records/Empire	
26 July	"Is It"	Tyla	Fax/Epic	
2 August	"Is It"	Tyla	Fax/Epic	
9 August	"Dynamite"	Tyla and Wizkid	Epic	
16 August	"Dynamite"	Tyla and Wizkid	Epic	
23 August	"Dynamite"	Tyla and Wizkid	Epic	
30 August	"Dynamite"	Tyla and Wizkid	Epic	
6 September	"Is It"	Tyla	Fax/Epic	
13 September	"Miami"	Odeal	LVRN	
20 September	"Miami"	Odeal	LVRN	
27 September	"Fun"	Rema	Interscope	
4 October	"Fun"	Rema	Interscope	
11 October	"Getting Paid"	Sarz, Asake, Wizkid and Skillibeng	1789	
18 October	"Getting Paid"	Sarz, Asake, Wizkid and Skillibeng	1789	
25 October	"Getting Paid"	Sarz, Asake, Wizkid and Skillibeng	1789	
1 November	"Who's Dat Girl"	Ayra Starr and Rema	Ayra Starr	
8 November	"Chanel"	Tyla	Fax/Epic	
15 November	"Chanel"	Tyla	Fax/Epic	
22 November	"Chanel"	Tyla	Fax/Epic	
29 November	"Chanel"	Tyla	Fax/Epic	
6 December	"Chanel"	Tyla	Fax/Epic	
13 December	"Chanel"	Tyla	Fax/Epic	
20 December	"Chanel"	Tyla	Fax/Epic	
27 December	"Chanel"	Tyla	Fax/Epic	

=== 2026 ===
Issue date	Single	Artist(s)	Record label(s)	Ref.
3 January	"Chanel"	Tyla	Fax/Epic	
10 January	"Chanel"	Tyla	Fax/Epic	
17 January	"Chanel"	Tyla	Fax/Epic	
24 January	"Chanel"	Tyla	Fax/Epic	
31 January	"Chanel"	Tyla	Fax/Epic	
7 February	"JoGoDo"	Wizkid and Asake	Starboy Entertainment	
14 February	"JoGoDo"	Wizkid and Asake	Starboy Entertainment	
21 February	"JoGoDo"	Wizkid and Asake	Starboy Entertainment	
28 February	"JoGoDo"	Wizkid and Asake	Starboy Entertainment	
7 March	"JoGoDo"	Wizkid and Asake	Starboy Entertainment	
14 March	"JoGoDo"	Wizkid and Asake	Starboy Entertainment	
21 March	"Over"	R2Bees	R2bees Entertainment	
28 March	"Over"	R2Bees	R2bees Entertainment	
4 April	"Worship"	Asake and DJ Snake	Empire/Giran Republic	
11 April	"Worship"	Asake and DJ Snake	Empire/Giran Republic	
18 April	"I Am"	Omah Lay	Warner	
25 April	"Let Me Be"	Second Voice	Int Vibes	
2 May	"She Did It Again"	Tyla featuring Zara Larsson	Epic/Fax	
9 May	"She Did It Again"	Tyla featuring Zara Larsson	Epic/Fax	
16 May	"She Did It Again"	Tyla featuring Zara Larsson	Epic/Fax	
23 May	"She Did It Again"	Tyla featuring Zara Larsson	Epic/Fax	
30 May	"She Did It Again"	Tyla featuring Zara Larsson	Epic/Fax	
5 June	"She Did It Again"	Tyla featuring Zara Larsson	Epic/Fax	
12 June	"She Did It Again"	Tyla featuring Zara Larsson	Epic/Fax	
19 June	"She Did It Again"	Tyla featuring Zara Larsson	Epic/Fax	
26 June	"Let Me Be"	Second Voice	Int Vibes	
3 July	"Let Me Be"	Second Voice	Int Vibes	
10 July	"Let Me Be"	Second Voice	Int Vibes	
17 July	"Let Me Be"	Second Voice	Int Vibes	
24 July	"Slick"	Victony	Encore	
31 July	"Slick"	Victony	Encore	
7 August	"Slick"	Victony	Encore	
14 August	"Slick"	Victony	Encore	
21 August	"Slick"	Victony	Encore	
28 August	"Slick"	Victony	Encore	
5 September	"Slick"	Victony	Encore	
12 September	"Slick"	Victony	Encore	
19 September	"Slick"	Victony	Encore	
26 September	"Slick"	Victony	Encore	
3 October	"Slick"	Victony	Encore	
10 October	"Slick"	Victony	Encore	
17 October	"Slick"	Victony	Encore	
24 October	"Heaven Baby"	Ayra Starr featuring Zayn	Mavin	
31 October	"Heaven Baby"	Ayra Starr featuring Zayn	Mavin	
7 November	"Ikebe 3000"	Blaqbonez featuring Asake	Chocolate City Music	
14 November	"Ikebe 3000"	Blaqbonez featuring Asake	Chocolate City Music	
21 November	"Chippie"	Aya Nakamura and Skepta	Warner Music France	

== See also ==
- UK Afrobeats Chart Top 20 songs of 2020
- Billboard U.S. Afrobeats Songs
