= Stefflon Don discography =

Recordings made by a British singer

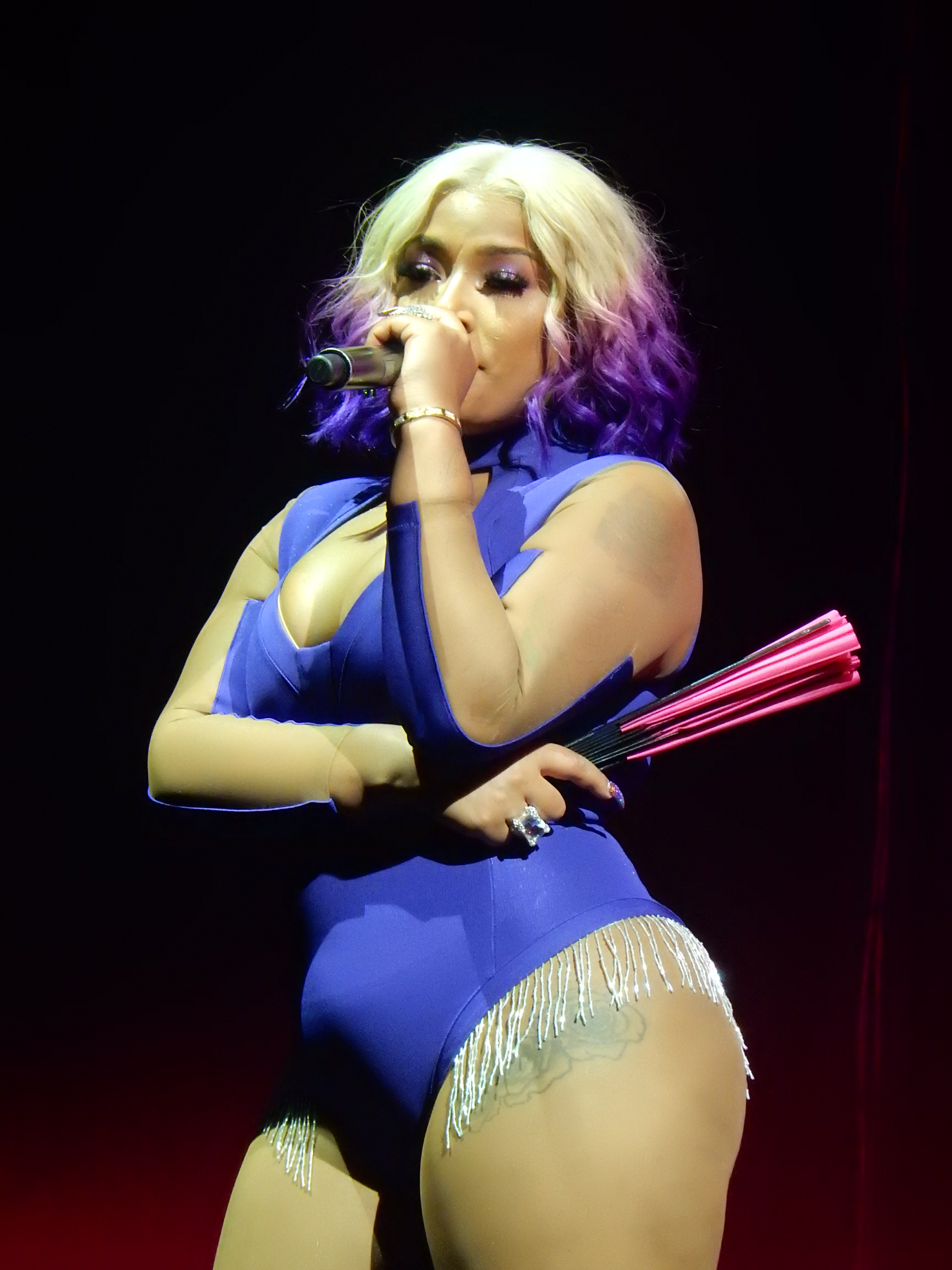
- Don performing at the Hammersmith Apollo in 2019
- Studio albums: 1
- Mixtapes: 2
- Extended plays: 1
- Singles: 35
- Featured singles: 32
- Promotional singles: 10
- Guest appearances: 23

British rapper and singer Stefflon Don has made numerous recordings since 2013.

== Studio albums ==
Title	Details	Peak chart positions
Title	Details	UK R&B
Island 54	Released: 28 June 2024; Label: 54 London, BMG; Format: CD, digital download, streaming	3

== Mixtapes ==
Title	Details	Peak chart positions	
Title	Details	UK	UK R&B
Real Ting	Released: 16 December 2016; Label: 54 London; Format: Streaming, digital download	—	—
Secure	Released: 17 August 2018; Label: 54 London, Quality Control, Polydor; Format: CD, digital download, streaming	35	4
"—" denotes a recording that did not chart or was not released in that territory.

== Extended plays ==
List of extended plays
Title	Extended play details
Hurtin' Me – The EP	Released: 12 January 2018; Label: Polydor; Format: Digital download

== Singles ==
=== As lead artist ===
List of singles, with selected chart positions, showing year released and album name
Title	Year	Peak chart positions									Certifications	Album
Title	Year	UK	BEL (FL)	FRA	GER	IRE	ITA	SPA	SWI	US Bub.	Certifications	Album
"Style"	2013	—	—	—	—	—	—	—	—	—		Non-album singles
"Instagram It"	2014	—	—	—	—	—	—	—	—	—		Non-album singles
"Real Ting"	2016	—	—	—	—	—	—	—	—	—		Real Ting
"16 Shots"	2017	—	—	—	—	—	—	—	—	—	BPI: Silver; SNEP: Gold	Real Ting
"Envy Us" (featuring Abra Cadabra)	2017	—	—	—	—	—	—	—	—	—		Real Ting
"Hurtin' Me" (featuring French Montana)	2017	7	—	70	—	78	—	—	—	19	BPI: 2× Platinum; SNEP: Gold	Hurtin' Me – The EP
"Ding-a-Ling" (with Skepta)	2017	64	—	—	—	—	—	—	—	—		Hurtin' Me – The EP
"Bum Bum Tam Tam" (with Future, J Balvin, Juan Magán and MC Fioti)	2017	—	17	3	51	—	42	9	51	—	BPI: Silver; BEA: Gold; FIMI: Gold; PROMUSICAE: Platinum; SNEP: Diamond	Non-album single
"Cigarette" (with Raye and Mabel)	2018	41	—	—	—	74	—	—	—	—	BPI: Gold	Side Tape (Note: "Cigarette" also appears as a bonus track on the deluxe edition of Mabel's High Expectations.)
"Push Back" (with Ne-Yo and Bebe Rexha)	2018	—	—	—	—	—	—	—	—	—		Good Man
"Senseless"	2018	63	—	—	—	—	—	—	—	—	BPI: Gold	Secure
"Calypso" (with Luis Fonsi)	2018	—	—	—	—	—	32	6	12	—	FIMI: Platinum; PROMUSICAE: 2× Platinum	Vida
"Pretty Girl" (featuring Tiggs Da Author)	2018	85	—	—	—	—	—	—	—	—		Secure
"Boasty" (with Wiley and Sean Paul featuring Idris Elba)	2019	11	—	—	—	82	—	—	—	—	BPI: Platinum	Non-album singles
"Take Off" (with Kojo Funds)	2019	—	—	—	—	—	—	—	—	—		Non-album singles
"Don Walk" (with Rymez)	2019	—	—	—	—	—	—	—	—	—		Non-album singles
"Phone Down" (with Lil Baby)	2019	68	—	—	—	—	—	—	—	—		Non-album singles
"Hit Me Up"	2019	—	—	—	—	—	—	—	—	—		Non-album singles
"How It's Done" (with Kash Doll, Kim Petras and Alma)	2019	—	—	—	—	—	—	—	—	—		Charlie's Angels
"The Reason Why" (with JP Cooper & Banx & Ranx)	2019	—	—	—	—	—	—	—	—	—		Non-album single
"Link Up" (with Geko, Deno and Dappy)	2019	84	—	—	—	—	—	—	—	—		22
"Move"	2020	—	—	—	—	—	—	—	—	—		Non-album singles
"Can't Let You Go"	2020	—	—	—	—	—	—	—	—	—		Non-album singles
"Dip" (with Ms Banks)	2021	—	—	—	—	—	—	—	—	—		Non-album singles
"Toxic Love" (with Midas the Jagaban)	2021	—	—	—	—	—	—	—	—	—		Non-album singles
"The Don" (with System.Inc and Jax Jones)	2021	—	—	—	—	—	—	—	—	—		Non-album singles
"Juice"	2022	—	—	—	—	—	—	—	—	—		Non-album singles
"Like That"	2022	—	—	—	—	—	—	—	—	—		Non-album singles
"Clockwork" (featuring Spice)	2022	—	—	—	—	—	—	—	—	—		Non-album singles
"The One"	2022	—	—	—	—	—	—	—	—	—		Non-album singles
"Tú" (with IzyBeats and Manuel Turizo)	2023	—	—	—	—	—	—	—	—	—		Edgehill
"Move It"	2023	—	—	—	—	—	—	—	—	—		Non-album single
"What's Poppin" (with Bnxn)	2023	—	—	—	—	—	—	—	—	—		Island 54
"Run Through" (with The Plug featuring Swae Lee)	2023	—	—	—	—	—	—	—	—	—		Plug Talk 2
"I Don't Wanna Work" (with Martin Solveig)	2023	—	—	—	—	—	—	—	—	—		Back to Life
"Deadly" (featuring Victony)	2023	—	—	—	—	—	—	—	—	—		Non-album single
"Intergalactic"	2024	—	—	—	—	—	—	—	—	—		Island 54
"Habibi" (with Blok3)	2024	—	—	—	—	—	—	—	—	—		Non-album single
"Dilemma" (featuring Sidhu Moose Wala)	2024	—	—	—	—	—	—	—	—	—		Island 54
"Like That" (with Kalash)	2025	—	—	—	—	—	—	—	—	—		Non-album singles
"S.L.S" (with Leto and Mr 1920)	2026	—	—	—	—	—	—	—	—	—		Non-album singles
"Tun Up" (with French Montana)	2026	—	—	—	—	—	—	—	—	—		Non-album singles
"—" denotes a recording that did not chart or was not released in that territory.

=== As featured artist ===
List of featured singles, with selected chart positions, showing year released and album name
Title	Year	Peak chart positions										Certifications	Album
Title	Year	UK	UK Dance	AUS	BEL (Fl)	FRA	GER	IRE	NLD	SCO	US	Certifications	Album
"Kitty Kat" (Lisa Mercedez featuring Stefflon Don)	2016	—	—	—	—	—	—	—	—	—	—		Non-album single
"I'm Back Again" (K Koke featuring Stefflon Don)	2016	—	—	—	—	—	—	—	—	—	—		Pure Koke, Vol. 4 (PK4)
"Fashion Killa (Papapapa)" (Mason featuring Stefflon Don)'	2016	—	—	—	—	—	—	—	—	—	—		Non-album single
"Hop On" (Angel featuring Stefflon Don)	2016	—	—	—	—	—	—	—	—	—	—		Her
"Popalik" (Cho featuring Stefflon Don)	2016	—	—	—	—	—	—	—	—	—	—		Knock Knock 3
"London" (Jeremih featuring Stefflon Don and Krept & Konan)	2016	—	—	—	—	—	—	—	—	—	—		Late Nights: Europe
"Touch Down" (KSI featuring Stefflon Don)	2016	—	—	—	—	—	—	—	—	—	—		Jump Around and Baywatch (Music from the Motion Picture)
"Money Haffi Mek" (New Gen featuring Stefflon Don and Abra Cadabra)	2017	—	—	—	—	—	—	—	—	—	—		NEW GEN
"Beast" (Toddla T featuring Andrea Martin and Stefflon Don)	2017	—	—	—	—	—	—	—	—	—	—		Foreign Light
"Instruction" (Jax Jones featuring Demi Lovato and Stefflon Don)	2017	13	3	72	37	145	31	29	25	10	—	BPI: Platinum; BVMI: Gold; FIMI: Gold; ARIA: Gold	Snacks
"Slumdog Millionaire" (Ghetts featuring Stefflon Don)	2017	—	—	—	—	—	—	—	—	—	—		Ghetto Gospel: New Testament
"Look What You Made Me Do" (Joyner Lucas featuring Stefflon Don)	2017	—	—	—	—	—	—	—	—	—	—		508-507-2209
"Réseaux" (Niska featuring Quavo and Stefflon Don)	2018	—	—	—	—	—	—	—	—	—	—		Commando
"Alone" (Halsey featuring Big Sean and Stefflon Don)	2018	—	—	—	—	—	—	—	—	—	66	RIAA: 2× Platinum	Hopeless Fountain Kingdom
"Same Team" (Labrinth featuring Stefflon Don)	2018	—	—	—	—	—	—	—	—	—	—		Non-album singles
"Diamond Body" (Guido Dos Santos featuring Mavado & Stefflon Don)	2018	—	—	—	—	—	—	—	—	—	—		Non-album singles
"Sober" (Nile Rodgers & Chic featuring Craig David and Stefflon Don)	2018	—	—	—	—	—	—	—	—	—	—		It's About Time
"Shot & Wine" (Sean Paul featuring Stefflon Don)	2019	—	—	—	—	—	—	—	—	—	—		Non-album single
"Scared of Love" (Rudimental featuring Ray BLK & Stefflon Don)	2019	—	17	—	—	—	—	—	—	—	—		Toast to our Differences
"Royalty" (XXXTentacion featuring Ky-Mani Marley, Stefflon Don & Vybez Kartel)	2019	—	—	—	—	—	—	—	—	—	—		Bad Vibes Forever
"47" (Sidhu Moose Wala, Mist and Steel Banglez featuring Stefflon Don)	2019	17	—	—	—	—	—	—	—	—	—		Non-album single
"Gimme De Ting" (Kaplee featuring Stefflon Don)	2020	—	—	—	—	—	—	—	—	—	—		Feel Good Playlist, Vol. 1 - EP
"3am in LA" (Ebenezer featuring Stefflon Don)	2020	—	—	—	—	—	—	—	—	—	—		Bad Romantic 2.5 - EP
"Birthday" (Yxng Bane featuring Stefflon Don)	2021	—	—	—	—	—	—	—	—	—	—		Non-album singles
"Shaker" (Toddla T & Sweetie Irie featuring Jeremiah Asiamah, Stefflon Don & S1mba)	2021	—	—	—	—	—	—	—	—	—	—		Non-album singles
"Over You"(Ray BLK featuring Stefflon Don)	2021	—	—	—	—	—	—	—	—	—	—		Access Denied
"Tell Me" (Steel Banglez featuring Clean Bandit, Wes Nelson, Stefflon Don and Unknown T)	2021	—	—	—	—	—	—	—	—	—	—		The Playlist
"Big Woman" (Miraa May featuring Stefflon Don)	2022	—	—	—	—	—	—	—	—	—	—		Tales of a Miracle
"Bun Fi Bun" (IQ featuring Stefflon Don)	2022	—	—	—	—	—	—	—	—	—	—		24 Hours
"Taboo" (Princess Diamz featuring Stefflon Don)	2022	—	—	—	—	—	—	—	—	—	—		Non-album single
"Down Flat" (Remix) (Kelvyn Boy featuring Tekno and Stefflon Don)	2022	—	—	—	—	—	—	—	—	—	—		For The Kulture
"Amazing" (Vybz Kartel featuring Stefflon Don)	2022	—	—	—	—	—	—	—	—	—	—		PlayStation Riddim
"Yummy" (Inna featuring Dhurata Dora and Stefflon Don)	2023	—	—	—	—	—	—	—	—	—	—		Non-album single
"I Am" (Jim Jones and Hitmaka featuring Stefflon Don)	2023	—	—	—	—	—	—	—	—	—	—		Back In My Prime
"Feels This Good" (Sigala, Caity Baser & Mae Muller featuring Stefflon Don)	2023	93	—	—	—	—	—	—	—	—	—		Every Cloud – Silver Linings & Sorry I'm Late
"Selecta" (Chase & Status featuring Stefflon Don)	2023	27	—	—	—	—	—	—	—	—	—	BPI: Silver	2 Ruff, Vol. 1
"Drip" (Prince Swanny featuring Stefflon Don)	2025	—	—	—	—	—	—	—	—	—	—		Zero Tolerance
"Jungle" (Sigma featuring Yung Saber and Stefflon Don)	2025	—	—	—	—	—	—	—	—	—	—		Day One
"Big Man Ting" (Afro Bros and SNE featuring Stefflon Don and Egnever)	2025	—	—	—	—	—	—	—	—	—	—		Non-album single
"For You" (Beenie Man, Snoop Dogg and Kemar McGregor featuring Elephant Man, D'yani, Tifa, Shaneil Muir, Vanessa Bling, Stefflon Don, Kraff and Pamputtae)	2026	—	—	—	—	—	—	—	—	—	—		Beenie Man
"—" denotes a recording that did not chart or was not released in that territory.

== Promotional singles ==
List of promotional singles, showing year released and album name
Title	Year	Album
"Double"	2014	Non-album single
"Lil Bitch"	2018	Secure
"What You Want" (featuring Future)	2018	Secure
"Fire in the Booth, Pt. 1" (Note: Freestyle recorded and released as part of Charlie Sloth's Beats 1 radio show.)	2019	Non-album singles
"Beg Mi Ah Link" (featuring Beam)	2021	Non-album singles
"Sweet Bounce" (with DJ Frass)	2022	Non-album singles
"Daily Duppy (Dem Dead)"	2022	Non-album singles
"Dead Gyal Talking"	2024	Non-album singles
"Dead Gyal Walking"	2024	Non-album singles
"Dat a Dat"	2024	Non-album singles
"Trouble" (with DJ Mac and CrashDummy)	2024	Non-album singles

== Guest appearances ==
List of non-single guest appearances, with other performing artists, showing year released and album name
Title	Year	Other artist(s)	Album
"Queen of Hearts"	2016	Bluey Robinson	The Red Room
"Popalik" (Uncredited)	2016	Cho	Knock Knock III
"Take Me As I Am" (Uncredited)	2016	Wretch 32, Kranium, Phoenix Thomas	Growing Over Life
"Wobble" (Remix)	2016	Lethal Bizzle	Non-album remixes
"What a Night" (Remix)	2016	Kat Deluna, Jeremih	Non-album remixes
"Jealousy"	2016	Loick Essien	Terminal 5
"Tiimmy Turner" (Remix)	2016	Raye	Non-album remixes
"Mad Ting Sad Ting" (Remix)	2016	Fekky, MoStack, Abra Cadabra, Young Spray, Ms Banks, J Hus	Non-album remixes
"Skin Tight" (UK Remix)	2017	Mr Eazi, Haile	Non-album remixes
"After the Afterparty" (VIP Mix)	2017	Charli XCX, Rita Ora, Raye	Non-album remixes
"Best Behaviour" (Remix)	2017	Louisa Johnson	Non-album remixes
"They Don't know"	2017	Tinie Tempah, Kid Ink, AoD	Youth
"Better"	2017	Lil Yachty	Teenage Emotions
"Look What You Made Me"	2017	Joyner Lucas	508-507-2209
"Addicted"	2018	Nafe Smallz	Movie Music
"Don't Sleep"	2018	Chromeo, French Montana	Head Over Heels
"Jet Plane Trip"	2018	Sean Paul	Mad Love the Prequel
"Peak" (Uncredited)	2018	Drake	Scorpion
"She Knows How to Love Me"	2018	David Guetta, Jess Glynne	7
"Senseless Ting"	2018	MHD	19
"Special"	2018	WSTRN	DOU3LE 3AK
"Nasty One" (Remix)	2018	Lil' Kim, Kranium, HoodCelebrityy	Non-album remixes
"Emotional" (Remix)	2018	Kamille, Chip	Non-album remixes
"My Girl" (Remix)	2018	Chip, Alkaline, Red Rat	Non-album remixes
"Last Goodbye"	2018	Clean Bandit, Tove Styrke	What Is Love?
"All Night Long"	2019	Fuse ODG	New Africa Nation
"A No No" (Remix)	2019	Mariah Carey	Non-album remix
"Outro"	2019	Nadia Nakai	Nadia Naked
"Like That"	2019	Quality Control, City Girls, Renni Rucci, Mustard	Control the Streets, Volume 2
"Swerve"	2019	Headie One, Nav	Music x Road
"Taste (Make It Shake)" (Remix)	2019	Aitch, Fenix Flexin	Non-album remixes
"Peace of Mind" (Remix)	2019	Sean Kingston, Trey Songz, Davido	Non-album remixes
"Talk About Us"	2019	Jason Derulo	2Sides (Side 1)
"Bombay"	2020	Tiwa Savage, Dice Ailes	Ceila
"3AM in LA"	2020	Ebenezer	Bad Romantic 2.5
"Michelin Star"	2020	D-Block Europe	The Blue Print: Us vs. Them
"No Drama"	2021	Alicaì Harley	The Red Room Intro (Yard Gyal Inna Britain)
"Invincible"	2021	Sidhu Moose Wala	Moosetape
"Original"	2021	Cho	Chosen
"Kiss My (Uh-Oh)" (Girl Power Remix)	2021	Anne-Marie, Little Mix, Becky Hill, Raye	Non-album remix
"Stefflon Don"	2021	Skillibeng	Crocodile Teeth
"Gotta Have It"	2021	Culture Jam, Ty Dolla $ign, Wale	Kawhi Leonard Presents: Culture Jam (Vol. 1)
"Diamond in da Dirt"	2021	BackRoad Gee	Reporting Live (From the Back of the Roads)
"Mirror"	2021	Konshens	Red Reign
"Word To My Mother"	2021	Dappy	Fortune
"Moments"	2021	Masicka	438
"FYE"	2022	Adekunle Gold	Catch Me If You Can
"Bands On Her"	2022	Uncle Murda	Love Don't Live Here
"Woman of the Year"	2022	Calvin Harris, Chlöe, Coi Leray	Funk Wav Bounces Vol. 2
"Oshey"	2023	SPINALL, BNXN fka Buju	Top Boy
"Senta e Levanta"	2023	Ludmilla, Topo La Maskara	Vilã
"Dance"	2023	KitschKrieg, Nemzzz, SFR, Skillibeng	German Engineering 1
"Addiction"	2023	Ruger	Ru the World
"Bars Afrique"	2024	Luciano, HoodBlaq	Seductive
"Renegade (We Never Run)"	2024	Raja Kumari, Jarina De Marco	Arcane League of Legends: Season 2
"Only One"	2025	Steel Banglez, Ikka	One Day It Will All Make Sense
"Portrait"	2025	450	Pieces of Me
"My Girl"	2026	Ayetian	JamPack
