= Second wave =

Second wave or Wave 2 may refer to:

== Arts and entertainment ==
- "Second Wave" (Baywatch), a 1989 television episode
- Hong Kong Second Wave, a group of Hong Kong film directors in late 1980s to 1990s
- Second Wave, a fictional terrorist group from the second season of 24

=== Music ===
- Second wave ska, or 2 Tone, music genre created in England in the late 1970s
- 2nd Wave (album), a 1988 album by Surface
- The Second Wave (Khoma album), a 2006 album by Khoma
- The Second Wave (EP), a 2021 EP by Ruger
- The Second Wave: 25 Years of NWOBHM, a 2003 album by British indie label Communiqué Records

== Computing ==
- 802.11ac Wave 2, 2nd generation 802.11ac Wi-Fi products
- Wave 2, an update for Windows Live

== History ==
- Second-wave feminism, a period of feminist history lasting approximately from the late 1960s through the 1980s
- The Second Wave: A Magazine of The New Feminism
- Second European colonization wave, starting in the second half of the 19th century with the New Imperialism period
- The deadly second wave of the Spanish flu
- The second wave of the COVID-19 pandemic
