= Sincerely, Benson =

2023 Studio album by Bnxn

Studio album by Bnxn
- Released: 5 October 2023
- Recorded: 2023
- Genres: Afrobeats; Amapiano; Dancehall; Gospel music; Afro-fusion
- Length: 43:40
- Labels: T.Y.E; Empire
- Producers: Jae5; Blaisebeatz; Sarz; Dro; Tempoe; Magicsticks; ATG; LeriQ; Davinchiii; Denzl

Bnxn chronology
Bad Since '97 (2022)	Sincerely, Benson (2023)	RnB (2024)

Singles from Sincerely, Benson
- 1. "Gwagwalada" Released: 15 February 2023; 2. "Pray" Released: 10 May 2023; 3. "Sweet Tea" Released: 6 September 2023

Sincerely, Benson is the debut studio album of Nigerian singer Bnxn which peaked at number 11 on the Billboard World Albums chart.

== Background ==
The 15-track album was released on 5 October 2023, through T.Y.E, and Empire Music. Sincerely, Benson is the follow up album of Bad Since '97 extended play. The album included guest appearances from artists such as Headie One, Kizz Daniel, Seyi Vibez, taves, 2Baba and Popcaan. It also features producers such as Jae5, Blaisebeatz, Sarz, Dro, Tempoe, Magicsticks, ATG, LeriQ, Davinchiii and Denzl. The album is a mixture of Afrobeats, Afro-fusion, Amapiano, Dancehall and Gospel. Sincerely, Benson was among the list of the most streamed albums in Nigeria. On an interview with Nandy Mabiba from Apple Music Radio Africa, Bnxn noted that his album title Sincerely, Benson was inspired by Burna Boy. Sincerely Benson stayed on the Apple Music top 10 charts for 14 weeks.

== Promotion ==
Before the album's release, BNXN released the singles "Pray", "Sweet Tea (Aduke)", and "Gwagwalada", the latter featuring Kizz Daniel and Seyi Vibez. On 7 September 2023, he released "Sweet Tea (Aduke)" while announcing the then-forthcoming album. By the time of the album's release, music videos for "Gwagwalada" and "Pray" had accumulated over 25 million combined views.

BNXN further promoted Sincerely, Benson with the Sincerely, BNXN Tour, which began on 15 October 2023 in Chicago and concluded on 12 November 2023 in Toronto. The tour included stops in Washington, D.C., New York City, Atlanta and Los Angeles, among other cities.

== Critical reception ==
Professional ratings
Review scores
Source	Rating
Pulse Nigeria	7.0/10
NotJustOk	7.1/10
Premium Times	7.0/10

Adeayo Adebiyi, a music reporter for Pulse Nigeria stated that “Overall, 'Sincerely, BNXN' is an introspective body of work that delivers impressive penmanship and smooth delivery that has earned BNXN the admiration of fans and the respect of his colleagues”.

Reviewing for NotJustOk, Utere Naomi stated that “In terms of theme and delivery, 'Sincerely, Benson' aptly lives up to its name. The songs authentically reflect BNXN's life and style, providing listeners with a genuine glimpse into his world. However, there's room for improvement, and BNXN could benefit from further honing his craft”.

Esther Kalu from Premium Times stated that “Based on personal observations while following BNXN’s journey, he goes out more in collaborations than his solos. In that light, this review compared BNXN’s solo tracks and features in the Sincerely Benson album. It showed that he shines better in collaborative than solo songs”.

== Track listing ==
Sincerely, Benson track listing
No.	Title	Writer(s)	Producer(s)	Length
1.	"My Life"	Daniel Benson	Denzl (Producer), Malik Bawa & Jofis	3:00
2.	"Best of Me"	Benson	JAE5	3:51
3.	"Maximum Damage" (featuring Headie One)	Benson, Irving Adjei	ATG Musick	2:51
4.	"Mukulu"	Benson	SAK PASE & KheilStone	2:43
5.	"Gwagwalada" (with Kizz Daniel and Seyi Vibez)	Benson; Oluwatobiloba Daniel; Oluwaloseyi Balogun	Sarz	3:08
6.	"Pidgin & English"	Benson & MAGIC!	Sarz	3:38
7.	"Sweet Tea (Aduke)"	Benson	SAK PASE & KheilStone	2:29
8.	"Realize" (featuring taves)	Benson; taves	Davinchiii	2:13
9.	"Party Don't Stop"	Benson	LeriQ	2:42
10.	"Right Energy"	Benson	ATG Musick & Jester	2:34
11.	"PRAY"	Benson	Magicsticks	2:57
12.	"Say My Name"	Benson	Tempoe	3:12
13.	"Toxic"	Benson	GuiltyBeatz, SAK PASE & BlaiseBeatz	2:36
14.	"Regret" (featuring 2Baba)	Benson, Innocent Idibia	BlaiseBeatz	3:14
15.	"Final Answer" (featuring Popcaan)	Benson, Andrae Sutherland	Leandro "Dro" Hidalgo	2:32
Total length:				43:40

== Charts ==
Weekly chart performance for Sincerely, Benson
Chart (2023)	Peak position
Nigeria Albums (TurnTable)	2

== Release history ==
Region	Date	Format	Version	Label	Ref
Various	5 October 2023	CD, digital download	Standard	TYE; Empire Distribution; Empire	
