= Both Ways =

Both Ways may refer to:

== Music ==
- Both Ways, a 2018 album by Donovan Woods
- Both Ways , a 2021 album by The Jeffrey Lewis & Peter Stampfel Band
- "Both Ways", a 2019 song by Liam Payne from LP1
- "Both Ways", a 2024 song by The Script from Satellites
- "Both Ways", a 2018 song by Stefflon Don from Secure (mixtape)

== Other uses ==
- Both Ways, an Australian bilingual teaching method also known as two-way education
