= Blok3 =

Turkish rapper and singer

- Also known as: Blok3
- Born: Hakan Aydın; August 15, 2002 (age 24); Gebze, Kocaeli, Turkey
- Origin: Turkey
- Genres: Indie pop; Hip hop; Arabesque
- Years active: 2021–present
- Label: Mundo Music

Hakan Aydın (born 15 August 2002), better known by his stage name Blok3, is a Turkish rapper and singer whose music blends indie pop and reggae.

== Life and career ==
Aydın was born on 15 August 2002, in the Gebze district of Kocaeli province. He developed an interest in music at an early age. After releasing his first song, "wow," in 2021, he achieved his breakthrough in 2022 with the song "VUR." He became known in 2023 for "Affetmem". The song has been viewed 60 million times on YouTube and played more than 100 million times on Spotify. Later in his career, he released the songs Baybay, Yaptırıcaz Tırnaklarını and Aklına ben gelicem. He won the award for "Best Rapper" at the 49 th Altın Kelebek Awards. He spoke at the award ceremony: "There are millions of people in the country—will you do it? Valla succeeded." I would like to thank my mom, my dad, and everyone who has supported me from the very beginning. Dads keep their word!

On 10 May 2024, he released the song "Habibi" with British rapper Stefflon Don. On 13 September 2024, he released his debut studio album, titled "Obsesif", on the Turkish label Mundo Music. He released an album titled "Kayıp persona" on 5 June 2026.

== Personal ==
For a time, he was in a relationship with the Turkish actress Nilsu Berfin Aktaş. Aydın decided to break up with Aktaş because Aktaş had a kissing scene in the series “Korkma Ben Yanındayım”, in which he played the lead role.

== Discography ==
Songs
Year	Song	Partnership
2026	Kayıp Kalp	—
2026	Sebebi Yar	—
2026	BABA	—
2026	Kırgınım	—
2026	Değiştiremezsin Yazılmışsa	—
2026	Son Bi Dans	—
2026	Sakin Ol Champ	—
2026	Çok Güzel Gülüyorsun	Poizi
2026	Allah Allah?	—
2026	Her Gece	—
2025	Kusura Bakma	—
2025	Hako Diyorlar	—
2025	Keçi	—
2025	Napıyosun Mesela?	—
2025	Git	—
2025	Mosmor Perde	—
2025	Keşke	Ati242
2024	ESC*BAR	—
2024	Habibi	Stefflon Don
2024	Laf	—
2024	Güzel ve İddialı	—
2024	Sevmeyi Denemedin	—
2024	Yok Zaten	—
2024	Gelme İstemem	—
2024	Zehirli Gül	—
2024	Eskisi Gibi	—
2024	Güzel Kızım	—
2024	Before/After	—
2024	Deva	—
2024	Sensiz Yaşayamam	—
2024	Hako Artık Business	—
2024	Uyuz	—
2024	Ne O Kaşlar Gözler	—
2024	Her Yerim Yara	—
2023	Salla Salla	—
2023	Aklına Ben Gelicem	—
2023	N'aptığını Bilmesem de	—
2023	Yaptırıcaz Tırnaklarını	—
2023	Baybay	—
2023	Affetmem	—
2022	Vur	—
2022	Patlat	—
2022	Dacia	Cenqa
2022	Ciro	—
2021	Woum Baby	—
2021	Freestyle#1	—
2021	Yallah	—
2021	Okey Okey	—
2021	Wow	—

=== Albums and EPs ===
Albums and EPs
Year	Broadcasting	Type
2024	OBSESIF	Studio album
2025	Virtüöz	EP
2026	KAYIP PERSONA	Studio album

== Awards ==
Year	Award-giving organization	Category
2023	49-th Pantene Golden Butterfly Awards	Best Rapper
