= Ding-a-Ling (Stefflon Don and Skepta song) =

2017 single by Stefflon Don and Skepta

Single by Stefflon Don & Skepta

from the album Hurtin' Me – The EP
- Released: 16 November 2017
- Genre: Grime
- Length: 3:07
- Label: Polydor Records
- Songwriters: Joseph Junior Adenuga: Stephanie Victoria Allen; Rodney Hwingwiri
- Producer: Rymez

Stefflon Don singles chronology
"Hurtin' Me" (2017)	"Ding-a-Ling" (2017)	"Bum Bum Tam Tam" (Remix) (2017)

Skepta singles chronology
"Excuse Me" (2017)	"Ding-a-Ling" (2017)	"Check It Out" (2018)

"Ding-a-Ling" is a song performed by British rappers Stefflon Don and Skepta. It was released as the second single from Stefflon Don's extended play Hurtin' Me – The EP on 16 November 2017 through Polydor Records. The song peaked at number 64 on the UK Singles Chart.

== Background ==
Talking to NME about the collaboration with Skepta, Stefflon Don said, "We actually didn’t go in the studio together, but I know Skepta and we talk, we’re friends. He’s cool, very humble. It’s very much a banger, but I’ll let you decide."

The song contains a sample from The Simpsons episode Lisa's Pony, which in turn interpolates Chuck Berry's My Ding-a-Ling.

== Music video ==
A music video to accompany the release of "Ding-a-Ling" was first released onto YouTube on 16 February 2018.

== Track listing ==
Digital download
No.	Title	Length
1.	"Ding-a-Ling"	3:07

== Charts ==
Chart (2017)	Peak position
UK Singles (OCC)	64
UK Hip Hop/R&B (OCC)	33

== Release history ==
Region	Date	Format	Label
United Kingdom	16 November 2017	Digital download; streaming	Polydor Records
