= My Ding-a-Ling =

Song most notably performed by Chuck Berry in 1972

Single by Chuck Berry

from the album The London Chuck Berry Sessions
- B-side: "Let's Boogie" (UK/Germany); "Johnny B. Goode (Live)" (most countries)
- Released: July 1972
- Recorded: February 3, 1972 at the Lanchester Arts Festival in Coventry, England
- Genre: Pop rock; novelty
- Length: 4:18 / 11:33 (Full Version)
- Label: Chess 2131
- Songwriter: Dave Bartholomew
- Producer: Esmond Edwards

Chuck Berry singles chronology
"Tulane" (1970)	"My Ding-a-Ling" (1972)	"Reelin' and Rockin'" (1973)

"My Ding-a-Ling" is a novelty song written and recorded by Dave Bartholomew. It was covered by Chuck Berry in 1972 and became his only number-one Billboard Hot 100 single in the United States. Later that year, a longer version was included on the album The London Chuck Berry Sessions. Guitarist Onnie McIntyre and Robbie McIntosh, a drummer who later formed the Average White Band, played on the single along with Nic Potter of the British band Van der Graaf Generator on bass.

== History ==
"My Ding-a-Ling" was originally recorded by Dave Bartholomew in 1952 for King Records. When Bartholomew moved to Imperial Records, he re-recorded the song under the new title "Little Girl Sing Ting-a-Ling". In 1954, the Bees on Imperial released a version titled "Toy Bell". Doug Clark and the Hot Nuts recorded it in 1961 on their album Nuts to You, and it was part of their live act for many years. Berry recorded a version called "My Tambourine" in 1968, but the version that topped the charts was recorded live during the Lanchester Arts Festival at the Locarno ballroom in Coventry, England on 3 February 1972 by the Pye Mobile Recording Unit, engineered by Alan Perkins, where Berry—backed by the Roy Young Band—topped a bill which also included Slade, George Carlin, Billy Preston, and Pink Floyd. Boston radio station WMEX disc jockey Jim Connors was credited with a gold record for discovering the song and pushing it to #1 over the airwaves and amongst his peers in the United States. Billboard ranked it as the No. 15 song for 1972.

The song is based on the melody of the 19th-century folk song "Little Brown Jug". Bartholomew's 1952 version contains a Shave and a Haircut motif.

== Content ==
The lyrics consistently exercise the double entendre in that a penis could just as easily be substituted for the toy bells and the song would still make sense. The Bartholomew and Berry versions have different lyrics but both follow that pattern.

== Critical reception ==
=== Chuck Berry version ===
The lyrics with their sly tone and innuendo (and the enthusiasm of Berry and the audience) caused many radio stations to refuse to play it. British morality campaigner Mary Whitehouse tried unsuccessfully to get the song banned. Whitehouse wrote to the BBC's Director General claiming that "one teacher told us of how she found a class of small boys with their trousers undone, singing the song and giving it the indecent interpretation which—in spite of all the hullabaloo—is so obvious... We trust you will agree with us that it is no part of the function of the BBC to be the vehicle of songs which stimulate this kind of behaviour—indeed quite the reverse."

In Icons of Rock, Scott Schinder calls the song "a sophomoric, double-entendre-laden ode to masturbation". Robert Christgau remarked that the song "permitted a lot of twelve-year-olds new insight into the moribund concept of 'dirty'".

== Censorship ==
For a re-run of American Top 40, some stations replaced the song with an optional extra when it aired a rerun of a November 18, 1972, broadcast of AT40 (where it ranked at #14) on December 6, 2008. Among other stations, most Clear Channel-owned radio stations to whom the AT40 1970s rebroadcasts were contracted did not air the rebroadcast that same weekend, although it was because they were playing Christmas music and not because of the controversy. Even back in 1972, some stations would refuse to play the song on AT40, even when it reached number one.

The controversy was lampooned in The Simpsons episode "Lisa's Pony", in which a Springfield Elementary School student attempts to sing the song during the school's talent show. He barely finishes the first line of the refrain before an irate Principal Skinner pushes him off the stage, angrily proclaiming "This act is over!" That scene was sampled by Stefflon Don and Skepta in their 2017 song Ding-a-Ling.

== Charts ==
=== Weekly charts ===
Chart (1972)	Peak position
Australia	47
Canadian Top Singles (RPM)	1
West Germany (GfK)	40
Irish Singles Chart	1
Netherlands (Single Top 100)	29
New Zealand (Listener)	19
Norway (VG-lista)	7
UK Singles (Official Charts)	1
US Billboard Hot 100	1
US R&B Singles (Billboard)	42
US Cash Box Top 100	1

=== Year-end charts ===
Chart (1972)	Rank
UK	18
US Billboard Hot 100	15
US Cash Box Top 100	40

== Certifications ==
Region	Certification	Certified units/sales
United States (RIAA)	Gold	1,000,000^{^}
^{^} Shipments figures based on certification alone.

== Bibliography ==
- The Billboard Book of Number One Hits (5th edition), Billboard Books, 2003, ISBN 978-0823076772
- Guterman, Jimmy and O'Donnell, Owen; The Worst Rock-and-Roll Records of All Time, New York: Citadel, 1991; ISBN 978-0806512310
