= MC Pipokinha =

Brazilian singer (born 1998)

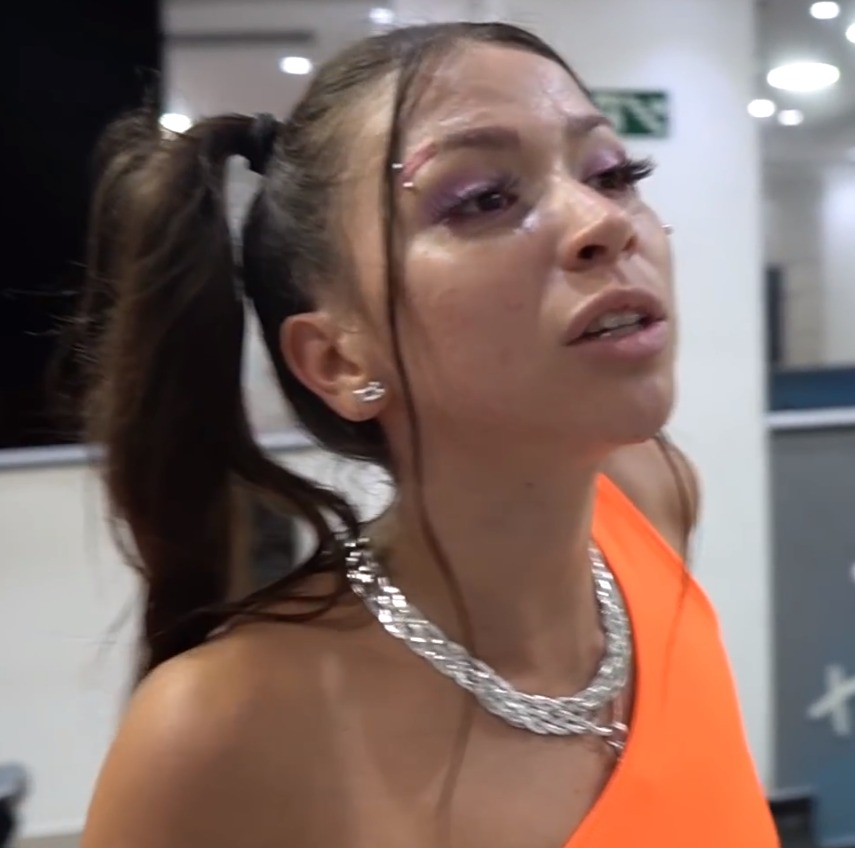
- MC Pipokinha in 2021
- Born: Doroth Helena de Sousa Alves; 17 August 1998 (age 27); Tubarão, Santa Catarina, Brazil
- Occupations: Singer; dancer; digital influencer
- Years active: 2020–present

Doroth Helena de Sousa Alves (born 13 August 1998), better known by her stage name MC Pipokinha ("Little Popcorn"), is a Brazilian singer, dancer and digital influencer. She has become particularly known for her lyrics and presentations which feature strong sexual content, especially after a female fan performed cunnilingus on her during a show.

== Career ==
=== 2019–2021: Beginning of career and notability ===
In 2019, Pipokinha moved from Tubarão to São Paulo without having a house to live in. The singer used to sleep in the homes of acquaintances or in bars and tobacco shops, when she didn't have her own house to sleep in yet. With only a cell phone and borrowed clothes, she got to know people in the Brazilian Funk scene. She later performed as a dancer in funk music videos, but without singing any songs. She was invited to participate in a YouTube channel with fictional stories on the favelas of São Paulo. It was on this channel that she created MC Pipokinha as a character. Pipokinha soon stood out in the videos through the figure of a seductive girl who resembles those in popular humor shows. In 2020, MC Pipokinha gained prominence in the music scene for singing daring lyrics and aggressive vocals to the sound of the popping beats of funk ousadia.

=== 2022–present: Success and recognition ===
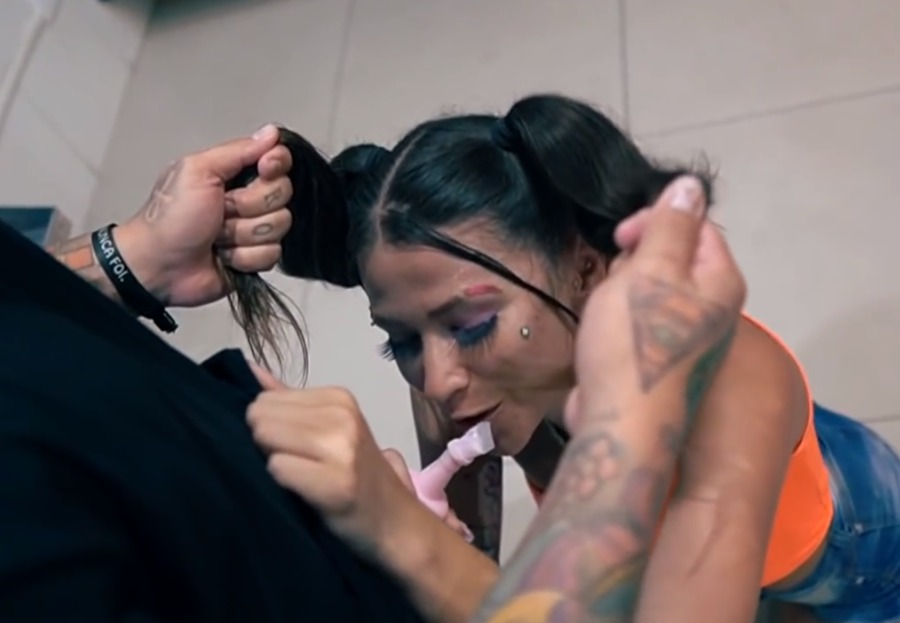
MC Pipokinha pretending to perform fellatio on a man

In 2022, already with thousands of followers on Instagram, the singer went viral on social networks, especially on TikTok, where she became a portrait of the new generation of Generation Z idols. With her success, Pipokinha signed a contract with the São Paulo funk production company Novo Império. She is currently managed by Wagner Magalhães, experienced in funk phenomena and who managed MC Fioti's career at the time of the megahit Bum Bum Tam Tam. Among the artist's successful tracks are Bota na Pipokinha, Tira as Crianças da Sala, Eu Sou a Pipokinha among many others, which already total more than 11 million views on YouTube and reach a number of 2.4 million monthly listeners on Spotify. In 2023, during an interview with Podcast Creators, Pipokinha revealed that she had profited more than R$500,000 from her profile on the Privacy platform. The artist said that she joined the platform during the COVID-19 pandemic and that it have improved her life.

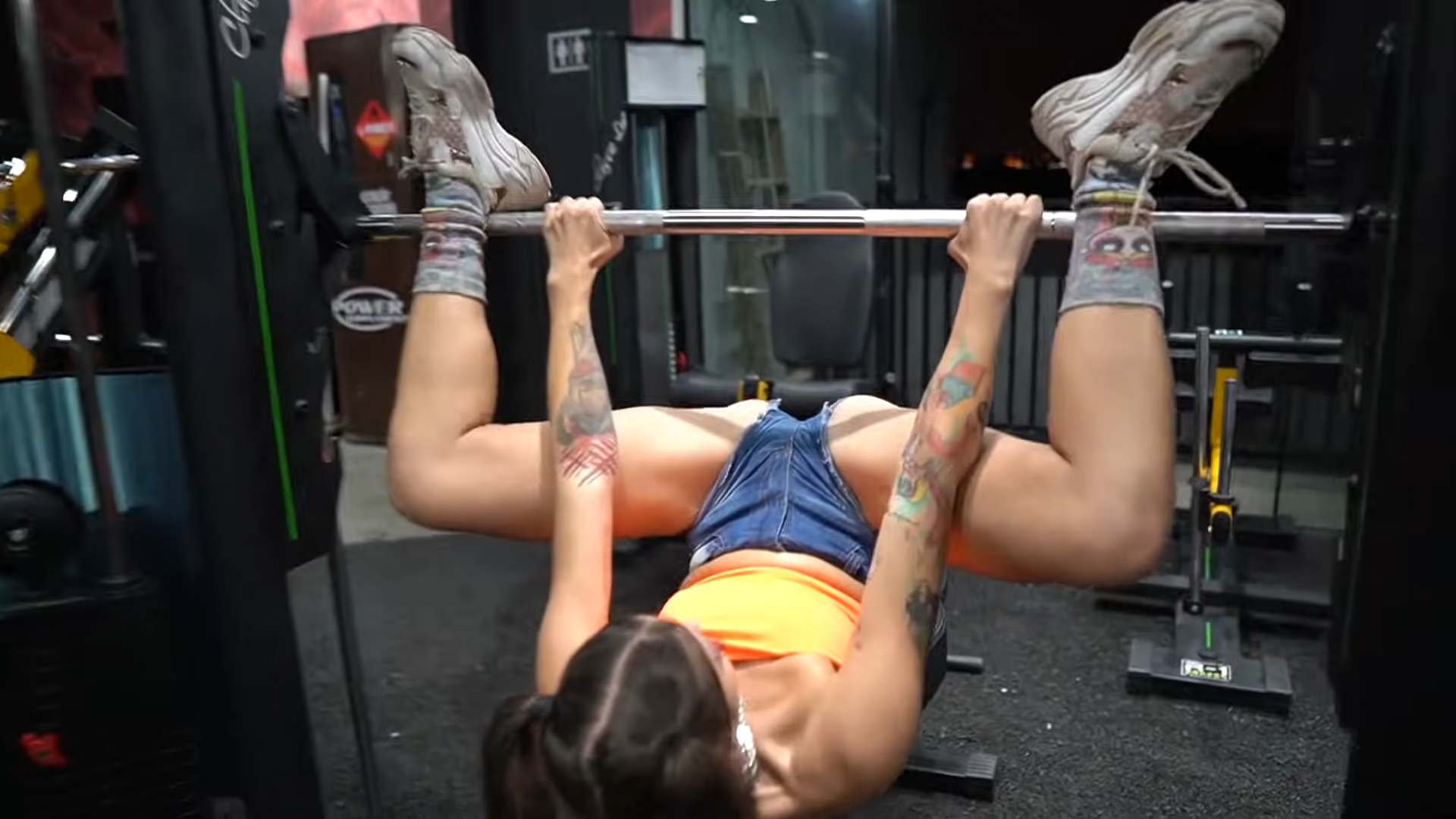
MC Pipokinha in a sexual pose

== Personal life ==
During an interview for the g1 portal, Pipokinha said she was the adopted daughter of a Mormon family, a Christian group that emerged in the United States. Pipokinha says that her mother only let religious music play in the house. The family had to pray several times a day and, at night, read the sacred scriptures, the Book of Mormon.

Photos of Pipokinha pregnant at 16 years old emerged, and soon the information was confirmed that the singer have had a daughter by sources close to her. The little that is known about the child is that she lives with her grandparents in the interior of Santa Catarina, that her mother visits her frequently, and that she is the result of a relationship between Pipokinha and her boyfriend at the time.

== Awards and nominations ==
Year	Award	Category	Result	Ref.
2022	Sobre Funk Award	Best Singer	Won	
