= Pandemic (EP) =

EP by Ruger
- Released: 12 March 2021
- Genre: Dancehall; reggae fusion
- Length: 19:34
- Label: Jonzing; Sony; Promise Land; Columbia
- Producer: D'Prince (exec.); Kukbeatz

Ruger chronology
Pandemic (2021)	The Second Wave (2021)

Singles from Pandemic
- 1. "Ruger" Released: 18 February 2021; 2. "Bounce" Released: 12 May 2021

Pandemic is the debut extended play by Nigerian singer Ruger. It was released on 12 March 2021 through Jonzing World and Sony Music UK. Production was handled by Kukbeatz.

== Background ==
Ruger, born Michael Adebayo Olayinka, developed a passion for music early on, growing up in a music-loving household. Exposed to a variety of genres such as Fuji, reggae, R&B, and dancehall, his influences ranged from King Wasiu Ayinde and Bob Marley to Sean Paul and Popcaan. While in secondary school, he composed songs that gained popularity among his peers, solidifying his aspirations to pursue music professionally. In 2019, Ruger began posting song covers on Instagram, which caught the attention of D'Prince, a Nigerian singer, music executive, and founder of Jonzing World. D'Prince reached out to Ruger and eventually signed him after recognizing his potential during recording sessions. It was during this period that D'Prince gave him the moniker "Ruger", inspired by the gun brand and Ruger’s energetic and focused recording style.

Pandemic was largely created during the COVID-19 lockdown in 2020, a period of uncertainty that Ruger channeled into his music. He described the project as an "isolation wonder", blending Afro-dancehall with his signature style of patois and pidgin. While some tracks like "Mona Lisa" and "Yekpa" were completed before the lockdown, the rest of the EP was conceived during this time. Ruger explained that the project’s title reflects the circumstances of its creation and his desire to turn a challenging period into something positive.

== Singles ==
The titular lead single "Ruger" was released on 18 February 2021. Its accompanying music video was directed by Seyi Akinlade. The EP's second single "Bounce" was released on 12 May 2021 alongside its music video. The song was produced by Kukbeatz and its video was directed by Ahmed Mosh. It was nominated for Best Afrobeats Single of the Year at the 2022 edition of the Headies.

== Critical reception ==
Motolani Alake of Pulse Nigeria praised Pandemic for showcasing Ruger’s "superstar delivery" and ability to blend reggae-fusion and Afro-pop seamlessly. Tracks like "Abu Dhabi" exemplify his talent with "incredible delivery" and dexterous lyricism, though the review noted that Jonzing's single choices, such as "One Shirt", failed to maximize his potential. Alake concluded Ruger is a "top talent" who now needs a hit single to solidify his rising status, rating the project 7.9/10.

== Track listing ==
All tracks are written by Michael Olayinka and produced by Kukbeatz.

Pandemic track listing
No.	Title	Length
1.	"Ruger"	3:11
2.	"Abu Dhabi"	3:19
3.	"Bow"	2:45
4.	"Monalisa"	3:43
5.	"Bounce"	3:04
6.	"Yekpa"	3:30
Total length:		19:34

== Release history ==
Release history and formats for Pandemic
Region	Date	Format	Label
Various	12 March 2021	Streaming; digital download	Jonzing; Sony; Promise Land; Columbia
