= Senseless (Stefflon Don song) =

2018 single by Stefflon Don

Single by Stefflon Don

from the album Secure
- Released: 18 May 2018; 12 November 2018 (Remix)
- Genre: Dancehall
- Length: 3:03; 2:53 (Remix)
- Label: Polydor
- Songwriters: Stephanie Allen; Rodney Hwingwiri
- Producer: Rymez

Stefflon Don singles chronology
"Push Back" (2018)	"Senseless" (2018)	"Calypso" (2018)

Remix cover

"Senseless" is a song by British rapper Stefflon Don. It was released as a single through the record label Polydor on 18 May 2018, peaking at number 63 on the UK Singles Chart. The song was written by Stefflon Don and Rymez, the latter of whom also produced the song. A remix, featuring Canadian rapper Tory Lanez, was released on 12 November 2018.

The song received a Gold certification from the BPI in August 2023 for exceeding sales of 400,000.

== Track listing ==
Digital download and streaming
No.	Title	Length
1.	"Senseless"	3:03

Remix featuring Tory Lanez
No.	Title	Length
1.	"Senseless" (featuring Tory Lanez)	2:53

== Charts ==
Chart (2018)	Peak position
UK Singles (OCC)	63

== Certifications ==
Region	Certification	Certified units/sales
United Kingdom (BPI)	Gold	400,000^{‡}
^{‡} Sales+streaming figures based on certification alone.
