= MC Fioti =

Brazilian rapper and singer

- Born: Leandro Aparecido Ferreira; 30 August 1994 (age 31); Itapecerica da Serra, São Paulo, Brazil
- Genres: Funk carioca
- Occupations: Rapper, singer, producer
- Years active: 2016–present

Leandro Aparecido Ferreira, better known by his stage name MC Fioti, is a Brazilian funk carioca rapper, singer and producer. He was born on 30 August 1994 in Itapecerica da Serra, São Paulo.

== Biography ==
He rose to popularity in 2016 thanks to his social media-savvy hit single "Vai Toma" which he recorded with fellow São Paulo native MC Pikachu. Characterized by lean, bright productions with heavy bass, Fioti unleashed a deluge of tracks over the next year with a variety of different collaborators like MC Lan and hip-hop duo, Tribo da Periferia. A remix of his catchy 2017 track "Bum Bum Tam Tam" caught fire when it became a five-way collaboration with Future, J Balvin, Stefflon Don, and Juan Magán becoming his biggest single to date. The original song has received over 1.5 billion views on YouTube.

In January 2021, he released the video for "Bum bum tam tam (remix vaccine Butantan)", recorded at the headquarters of the Butantan Institute, with the participation of employees of the institution, in honor of the work of the research center in the development of the CoronaVac vaccine in partnership with the biopharmaceutical company Sinovac Biotech.

== Discography ==
- #Vemverão (Warner Music)
- Sentou k ladinha (Warner Music)
- Band Life (Warner Music)
- Nois é Thug Life (Warner Music)
- Bum Bum Tam Tam
- Lá vai xerecão (Warner Music)
- De Quebradinha (Warner Music)
- Maloqueiro (Warner Music)
- Desce de perna aberta (Warner Music)
- Quadradinho (Warner Music)
- Engatilha e Bum (Warner Music)
- Taikondo (Warner Music)
- Bum Bum Tam Tam (Remix) (Aftercluv Dance Lab / Island / Universal)
- Vida de casado (Warner Music)
- Bum Bum Tam Tam (Remix) (Aftercluv Dance Lab / Island / Universal)

== Singles ==
Year	Title	Peak positions						Certification
Year	Title	BEL	FRA	GER	ITA	SPN	SWI	Certification
2017	"Bum Bum Tam Tam"	—	5	—	—	87	54	
2017	"Bum Bum Tam Tam (Remix)" (MC Fioti / Future / J Balvin / Stefflon Don / Juan Magan)	17	108	51	42	9	51	BPI: Gold
2019	"Mueve" (Gianluca Vacchi, Nacho, Becky G featuring MC Fioti)	—	—	—	—	—	—	

== See also ==
- MC Pipokinha
