= Asiwaju =

Single by Ruger

from the album Ru the World
- Released: 16 November 2022
- Genre: Afrobeats
- Length: 3:36
- Label: Jonzing World; Sony; Promise Land; Columbia
- Songwriter: Michael Adebayo Olayinka
- Producer: Kukbeatz

Ruger singles chronology
"Red Flags" (2022)	"Asiwaju" (2022)	"Jonzing Boy" (2023)

Music video
- "Asiwaju" on YouTube

"Asiwaju" is a song by Nigerian singer Ruger. Produced by Kukbeatz, the song was released by Jonzing World on 16 November 2022, alongside "Red Flags", as the second single from his debut studio album Ru the World (2022). In December 2024, "Asiwaju" was certified gold in France.

== Composition and lyrics ==
Produced by Kukbeatz, "Asiwaju" is an Afrobeats song with lyrics centered on success, confidence, and leadership. Ruger described the song as being about his lifestyle, explaining that he was expressing how he felt ahead of his peers and believed that nothing could stop his progress. Its title comes from the Yoruba word "asiwaju", meaning a leader or forerunner, which reflects the song's theme of being at the forefront. The lyrics also contain references to wealth and status as Ruger celebrates his achievements.

== Commercial performance ==
Upon release, "Asiwaju" quickly gained traction and peaked at number one on Nigeria's Apple Music Top Songs chart, spending one month at the top. The track, alongside "Red Flags", debuted on the TurnTable Top 100 Songs chart at number 70 after just two days of tracking. In its second week, "Asiwaju" rocketed from No. 70 to No. 7 on the TurnTable Top 100, tallying 2.10 million streams (ranking fifth on streaming) and 23.2 million in radio reach (ranking 19th on radio). It was Ruger's fourth top-ten entry on the chart, joining "Bounce", "Dior", and "Girlfriend".

By the week of 30 December 2022, to 5 January 2023, "Asiwaju" reached number one on the TurnTable Top 100, tallying 3.22 million streams and 69.6 million in radio reach. It held the position for four consecutive weeks, equaling the four-week reign of Gyakie's "Forever (Remix)" with Omah Lay as the longest-running number-one song released under Sony Music. During this time, the song also broke records for its performance on radio, with 78.9 million in radio reach during the week of January 13–19, 2023, surpassing Kizz Daniel's "Cough (Odo)." "Asiwaju" eventually spent seven weeks atop the TurnTable Top 100, becoming the longest-running number-one song since Fireboy DML and Asake's "Bandana." It also tied for the third longest number-one run in the chart’s history, behind Omah Lay’s "Godly" (11 weeks) and Joeboy's "Sip (Alcohol)" (10 weeks). After losing the number-one spot, "Asiwaju" remained on the charts for several additional weeks before exiting in early March 2023.

== Accolades ==
Awards and nominations for "Asiwaju"
Organization	Year	Category	Result	Ref.
African Entertainment Awards USA	2023	Song of the Year	Nominated	
The Headies	2023	Afrobeats Single of the Year	Nominated	
The Headies	2023	Viewers' Choice	Nominated	

== Charts ==
=== Weekly charts ===
Chart performance for "Asiwaju"
Chart (2022–23)	Peak position
Nigeria (TurnTable Top 100)	1
US Afrobeats Songs (Billboard)	16
UK Afrobeats (Official Charts)	2

=== Year-end charts ===
2023 year-end chart performance for "Asiwaju"
Chart (2023)	Position
US Afrobeats Songs (Billboard)	27

== Certifications ==
Certifications for Asiwaju
Region	Certification	Certified units/sales
Nigeria (TCSN)	3× Platinum	300,000^{‡}
United Kingdom (BPI)	Silver	200,000^{‡}
France (SNEP)	Gold	100,000^{‡}
^{‡} Sales+streaming figures based on certification alone.
