= Ru the World =

Studio album by Ruger
- Released: 1 September 2023
- Genre: Afrobeats; dancehall
- Length: 56:48
- Label: Jonzing; Sony; Promise Land; Columbia
- Producer: D'Prince (exec.); Jugglerz; BenjiFlow; TheKidParris; Legendury Beatz; Cadenza; TSB; Kukbeatz; Frnkie

Ruger chronology
The Second Wave (2021)	Ru the World (2023)	RnB (2024)

Singles from Ru the World
- 1. "Red Flags" Released: 16 November 2022; 2. "Asiwaju" Released: 16 November 2022; 3. "Jonzing Boy" Released: 12 May 2023; 4. "Bun Bun" Released: 12 May 2023; 5. "Kristy" Released: 28 July 2023

Ru the World is the debut studio album by Nigerian singer-songwriter Ruger. It was released on 1 September 2023 by Jonzing World. The album features guest appearances from Stefflon Don, Projexx, Sauti Sol, Govana and Jugglerz. Ruger assisted notable producers such as Kukbeatz, Cadenza, TSB, Legendury Beatz, BenjiFlow, TheKidParris, Jugglerz and Frnkie.

== Background ==
On 11 March 2023, Ruger announced the name of the album; he went on a North America tour to promote the album. In an interview with OkayAfrica, Ruger explained that Ru the World takes its title from a nickname used by those close to him. "People around me tend to call me 'Ru,' so I went with it," he explained. The album blends Afrobeats and dancehall, genres Ruger grew up with, noting that "Dancehall and Afrobeats were the type of songs I grew up listening to."

== Singles ==
The album's lead single "Red Flags" was released on 16 November 2022, alongside the album's second single "Asiwaju". "Asiwaju" was produced by Kukbeatz while "Red Flags" was produced by TSB. The music video for "Asiwaju" was released on 16 December 2022 and was directed by David Anthony. "Asiwaju" was nominated for Afrobeats Single of the Year at The Headies 2023. The album's third and fourth singles "Jonzing Boy" and "Bun Bun" were both released on 12 May 2023. "Jonzing Boy" was produced by Kukbeatz while "Bun Bun" was produced by Jugglerz. The fifth single "Kristy" was released on 28 July 2023 and produced by Kukbeatz.

== Critical reception ==
Professional ratings
Review scores
Source	Rating
Afrocritik	7.8/10
NotJustOk	7.5/10
Pulse Nigeria	8.1/10

Ru the World received generally positive reviews from critics. Adeayo Adebiyi of Pulse Nigeria praised Ru the World for Ruger's mastery in fusing dancehall and Afrobeats with R&B and hip hop, stating, "His music packs an elevated level of musicality both in penmanship, delivery, and sheer acoustic appeal." Adebiyi highlighted Ruger's skillful balance of hedonism and personal reflection on tracks like "I Want Peace" and "Dear Ex", though he suggested that the album's 53-minute runtime might impact its replay value, proposing a shorter tracklist might have been preferable. He rated the album 8.1/10, calling it a "Champion" project.

Patrick Ezema's review for Afrocritik described Ru the World as showcasing Ruger's signature blend of Dancehall and Afrobeats while focusing on catchy, instant hits rather than deeper themes. Ezema wrote, "Ru the World is probably the sweetest-sounding album released this year, but a meal of sweets does not make for a very wholesome diet." He appreciated the international collaborations but notes issues like poor sound engineering and lack of thematic cohesion, rating it 7.8/10.

In contrast, Betty Godson's review for NotJustOk praised Ru the World for its strong songwriting and melody, noting its seamless sequencing and confident themes. Godson wrote, "Ruger lives up to the hype he built for this album. His songwriting, melody progression, and storytelling are at an all-time high on this project." She rated the album 7.5/10, acknowledging some unevenness, particularly with Stefflon Don's performance.

Gabriel Myers Hansen's review for Music in Africa commended Ru the World for Ruger's adept blend of dancehall and Afrobeats, highlighting his talent for catchy melodies and engaging storytelling. Hansen observed, "The album also enjoys the advantages of harmony and great sequencing, making for fluid listening." Despite its frequent focus on sexual themes, he appreciated the album's clear purpose and strong sequencing.

== Track listing ==
Ru the World track listing
No.	Title	Writer(s)	Producer(s)	Length
1.	"Tour"	Michael Olayinka	Kukbeatz	2:52
2.	"Ashana"	Olayinka	Legendury Beatz	3:15
3.	"I Want Peace"	Olayinka	Cadenza	2:39
4.	"Blue"	Olayinka	Kukbeatz	3:23
5.	"Addiction" (featuring Stefflon Don)	Olayinka; Stephanie Allen	Kukbeatz	3:08
6.	"Kristy"	Olayinka	Kukbeatz	4:20
7.	"All My Days" (featuring Sauti Sol)	Olayinka; Bien-Aimé Baraza; Willis Chimano; Savara Mudigi; Polycarp Otieno	BenjiFlow; Otieno; Mudigi	3:49
8.	"Asiwaju"	Olayinka	Kukbeatz	3:36
9.	"Nine"	Olayinka	Kukbeatz	3:50
10.	"Likely" (featuring Govana)	Olayinka; Romeo Nelson	Frnkie	3:56
11.	"BoyToy"	Olayinka	TheKidParris	3:08
12.	"Dear Ex" (featuring Jugglerz)	Olayinka; Jonas Lang; Martin Willumeit; Paul Spurny	Jugglerz	2:45
13.	"Island Girl" (featuring Projexx)	Olayinka; Johni James	TSB	3:25
14.	"Red Flags"	Olayinka; Ikeoluwa Oladigbolu	TSB	2:55
15.	"Jonzing Boy"	Olayinka	Kukbeatz	3:05
16.	"Bun Bun"	Olayinka; Lang; Willumeit; Joachim Piehl; Kwame Yeboah	Jugglerz	3:02
17.	"Holy Ground"	Olayinka	Kukbeatz	3:32
Total length:				56:48

== Personnel ==
- Michael "Ruger" Olayinka – vocals, writer
- Charles "D'Prince" Enebeli - executive producer
- Stephanie "Stefflon Don" Allen – vocals, writer
- Romeo "Govana" Nelson – featured artist, writer
- Bien-Aimé Baraza – vocals, piano, guitar, writer
- Willis Chimano – vocals, keyboard, writer
- Savara Mudigi – vocals, bass guitar, drums, writer
- Polycarp Otieno – guitar, writer
- Johni "Projexx" James – vocals, writer
- Jonas Lang – producer, writer
- Martin Willumiet – producer, writer
- Paul Spurny – producer, writer
- BenjiFlow – producer
- TheKidParris – producer
- Legendury Beatz
  - Okiemute Oniko – producer
  - Uzezi Oniko - producer
- Cadenza – producer
- Ikeoluwa "TSB" Oladigbolu – producer
- Uche "Kukbeatz" Chukwudi – producer
- Frnkie – producer
- Eduek "Milla Mix" Jonah – mixing engineer, mastering engineer
- Adam Lunn – mixing engineer, mastering engineer

== Charts ==
=== Weekly charts ===
Chart performance for Ru the World
Chart (2023–2025)	Peak position
Nigeria (Official Top 100 Albums)	9

== Release history ==
Release history and formats for Ru the World
Region	Date	Format	Label
Nigeria	1 September 2023	Streaming; digital download	Jonzing; Sony; Promise Land; Columbia
