= RnB (EP) =

2024 extended play by Ruger and Bnxn

EP by Ruger and Bnxn
- Released: 18 April 2024
- Genre: Afrobeats
- Length: 20:35
- Labels: Blown Boy; TYE; Empire
- Producers: Blaisebeatz; Kukbeatz; Sarz

Ruger chronology
Ru the World (2023)	RnB (2024)	BlownBoy RU (2025)

Bnxn chronology
Sincerely, Benson (2023)	RnB (2024)	Captain (2025)

Singles from RnB
- 1. "Romeo Must Die (RMD)" Released: 29 February 2024; 2. "Poe" Released: 11 April 2024

RnB is a collaborative extended play by Nigerian singers Ruger and Bnxn. It was released on 18 April 2024, by Blown Boy Entertainment, TYE Entertainment, and Empire Distribution. No other artists were featured on the project, which enlists production from Blaisebeatz, Sarz and Kukbeatz.

== Background ==
In August 2022, Ruger and Bnxn were involved in an online dispute, caused by rivalry between their fan bases. Bnxn told Billboard that fan behavior in Nigeria, including frequent online attacks, contributed to the situation. Both artists also stated that interactions between fans at live events further escalated tensions. The dispute was later resolved after the pair met on a flight to London. Ruger said the conflict stemmed from a lack of direct interaction and emphasized that both artists were focused on their music. Following the reconciliation, they recorded a joint project, RnB, which was completed within three days.

== Singles ==
RnB housed two singles. The lead single, "Romeo Must Die (RMD)" was released on 29 February 2024, alongside its music video. The track was produced by Kukbeatz and serves as their debut single together. The second single, "Poe", was released on 11 April 2024 and was produced by Blaisebeatz.

== Critical reception ==
Professional ratings
Review scores
Source	Rating
Afrocritik	7/10
Pulse Nigeria	7.2/10

RnB received mixed reviews from critics. In Abioye Damilare Samson's review for Afrocritik, he described RnB as "a thoroughly enjoyable listen," but notes that "fans hoping for glimpses into Ruger and BNXN’s reconciliation will be disappointed," as the EP focuses more on feel-good, love, and party themes than their past conflict. He rated the EP a 7/10.

Adeayo Adebiyi of Pulse Nigeria stated that RnB is an "enjoyable listen" and described it as "an anticlimactic end" to Ruger and Bnxn's much-publicized rift. He notes that the EP, while offering some catchy melodies, ultimately feels "unsuitable and unexciting for the moment it's meant to mark." Adebiyi gave the project a rating of 7.2/10.

Patrick Ezema of The Lagos Review noted that while RnB showcases the talents of Ruger and Bnxn, it fails to live up to the monumental occasion it signifies. He criticized the project for not reflecting the story behind their highly publicized feud, stating that "the EP gives nothing away about all of the lore behind its release." Ezema also highlighted the imbalance in themes, noting Ruger's problematic view of women in tracks like "Ilashe". Despite these flaws, he found that their "superb talents and decent chemistry" make the project a solid addition to their discographies.

== Track listing ==
RnB track listing
No.	Title	Writer(s)	Producer(s)	Length
1.	"Bae Bae"	Michael Olayinka; Daniel Benson; Marcel Akunwata	Blaisebeatz	2:34
2.	"Poe"	Olayinka; Benson; Akunwata	Blaisebeatz	3:26
3.	"Calculate Love"	Olayinka; Benson; Uche Chukwudi	Kukbeatz	3:01
4.	"Ilashe"	Olayinka; Benson; Osabuohien Osaretin	Sarz	2:40
5.	"Romeo Must Die (RMD)"	Olayinka; Benson; Chukwudi	Kukbeatz	2:40
6.	"Party Monster"	Olayinka; Benson	Kukbeatz	2:55
7.	"Not Done"	Olayinka; Benson	Blaisebeatz	3:16
Total length:				20:35

== Personnel ==
- Michael "Ruger" Olayinka – vocals, writer
- Daniel "Bnxn" Benson – vocals, writer
- Marcel "Blaisebeatz" Akunwata – producer, writer, recording engineer
- Osabuohien Osaretin – producer, writer, recording engineer
- Uche "Kukbeatz" Chukwudi – producer, writer, recording engineer
- Michael "Syn X" Nwachukwu – mixing engineer, mastering engineer
- Eduek "Milla Mix" Jonah – mixing engineer, mastering engineer
- Luke Argilla – spatial audio engineer

== Release history ==
Release history and formats for RnB
Region	Date	Format	Label
Various	18 April 2024	Streaming; digital download	Blown Boy; TYE; Empire
