= Cho (rapper) =

Dutch rapper

- Born: Giovanni Rustenberg; 6 February 1993 (age 33)
- Origin: Amsterdam, Netherlands
- Genre: Rap
- Occupation: Rapper
- Years active: 2009–present
- Labels: Streetknowledge, Top Notch
- Formerly of: SlodderVosGang, Straight Outta Control

Giovanni Rustenberg, known professionally as Cho (born in Amsterdam on 6 February 1993) is a Dutch rapper. He was part of the hip hop collective SlodderVosGang and Straight Outta Control before going solo.

SlodderVosGang was a collective started by Cho, Adje, Reverse and Jayh. Jowy Rose joined in 2014. They released the mini album S.V.G. and the single "Zeg me". While in SlodderVosGang, Cho pushed his career with two mixtapes Knock Knock in 2012 and Knock Knock 2 in 2013. He also appeared as a guest on albums by Reverse, Broederliefde and Keizer.

Straight Outta Control was a hip hop formation that included besides Cho, the artists Big2, Adje, Dio, Hef and MocroManiac. In 2015, they released the EP S.O.C. / Straight Outta Control and they had the hit "Dat nu".

As solo rapper, Cho has released three albums all making to the Dutch Albums Top 5, Knock Knock III in 2016, Since '93 in 2019 and Chosen in 2021.

In 2016, his collaboration with Stefflon Don and record producer Spanker in the single "Popalik" earned him the Britse Urban Music Awards.

== Personal life ==
His older brother Randy Rustenberg was a former professional football player in the Netherlands.

== Discography ==
=== Albums ===
Year	Album	Peak positions		Certification
Year	Album	NED	BEL (Fl)	Certification
2016	Knock Knock III	3	108	
2019	Since '93	4	54	
2021	Chosen	4	–	
2022	Thnx	12	–	
2023	Knock Knock IV	4	87	
2025	Giovanni I	36	–	

Collaborative albums

Year	Album
2016	Konings (joint album with Adje)

As part of SlodderVosGang

- 2014: S.V.G. (a mini album)

As part of Straight Outta Control

- 2015: S.O.C. / Straight Outta Control (an EP)

=== Mixtapes ===
Year	Mixtape
2012	Knock Knock
2013	Knock Knock 2

=== Singles ===
as part of SlodderVosGang

- 2014: "Zeg me"

as part of Straight Outta Control

- 2015: "Dat nu"

solo

Year	Title	Peak positions			Album
Year	Title	NED Single Top 100	NED Dutch Top 40	BEL (Fl)	Album
2015	"Misschien wel hè?"	54	–	17 (Ultratip*)	
2015	"Was je nog maar hier"	95	–	–	
2016	"Ik mis je" (feat. La Rouge)	33	2 (Tipparade)	–	
2016	"Popalik" (feat. Stefflon Don)	54	–	–	MNM UrbaNice 2016 (compilation)
2016	"Eerste keer 2.0" (feat. Abigail Johnson & Kempi)	99	–	–	
2017	"Op de weg" (Equalz / Adje / Cho)	3	1 (Tipparade)	Tip	
2018	"Hooptie Money" (with Esko, JoeyAK & MocroManiac)	71	–	–	
2018	"Put It on Me" (feat. Abigail Johnson)	80	–	–	
2018	"Bende" (with Spanker, Latifah feat. Idaly)	94	–	–	
2018	"Chemistry" (with Architrackz & Equalz feat. Mula B)	35	–	–	
2019	"Astmaflow"	56	–	–	
2019	"Pinpas" (feat. Sevn Alias)	43	–	–	
2019	"Single" (Architrackz & Equalz)	87	–	–	
2020	"Vergeet"	90	–	–	
2021	"Cardi" (feat. Frenna)	81	–	–	

Featured in

Year	Title	Peak positions	Album
Year	Title	NED Single Top 100	Album
2016	"Location" (Jonna Fraser feat. Cho)	64	
2017	"Oeps" (Latifah feat. Cho)	80	
2017	"Bandz" (Jonna Fraser feat. Cho)	45	
2018	"Schudden" (Bokoesam feat. Cho)	92	

=== Other songs ===
Year	Title	Peak positions	Album
Year	Title	NED Single Top 100	Album
2016	"Eerste keer" (feat. Abigail Johnson)	88	
2018	"Soldaat" (with Sevn Alias, Murda, Jayh)	74	
2019	"Zag je staan" (feat. Idaly)	72	
2019	"Bernie Mac" (feat. JoeyAK)	100	
2021	"Original"	74	
2021	"Nasty" (feat. Bryan Mg)	95	
