= Yaz Şarkısı =

- Genre: Romantic comedy
- Written by: Ramazan Demirli; Zafer Özer Çetinel; Görkem Tüzün
- Story by: Can Sinan
- Directed by: Doğa Can Anafarta
- Starring: Nilsu Berfin Aktaş; Mustafa Mert Koç; Efekan Can
- Music by: Ercüment Orkut; Mehmet Cem Tuncer
- Country of origin: Turkey
- Original language: Turkish
- No. of seasons: 1
- No. of episodes: 8

Production
- Producers: Efe Irvül; Yaşar Irvül; Erhan Çaylak
- Production location: Istanbul Rize
- Running time: 120 minutes
- Production company: Pastel Film

Original release
- Network: Fox
- Release: 9 July – 27 August 2023

Yaz Şarkısı is a Turkish romantic comedy series created by Doğa Can Anafarta. The series set to premiered on July 9, 2023 on FOX TV. The show follows the story of a lively young woman who moves to Istanbul to fulfill her late father's dream. However, her arrival shakes the foundations of the friendship between two close friends, Murat and Kemal. The series, also known as Melody of Love or Summer Song, was written by Ramazan Demirli, Zafer Özer Çetinel, and Görkem Tüzün. The leading roles in the series are Nilsu Berfin Aktaş, Mustafa Mert Koç, and Efekan Can.

== Summary ==
Yaz, driven by her late father's dream, when she moves to Istanbul, enter into a new chapter in her life. Little did she know that her arrival would stir up turbulence in the unshakeable bond between two close friends, Murat and Kemal. To shower them with kindness, and make their lives easier. They patiently wait to be noticed, hoping that their silent devotion will eventually be acknowledged. But patience has its limits, and sometimes it leads to unforeseen consequences. Just like in the case of Summer...

Kemal, attempting to persuade Smile Music's owner for a new vocalist, brings Yaz along with Mehmet to the company. Kemal introduces Yaz as the potential new vocalist, and despite her initial rejections, fate takes an unexpected turn during this encounter. Suddenly, Yaz finds herself immersed in photoshoots and music video preparations. Meanwhile, Emine seizes the opportunity to meet her future daughter-in-law and wastes no time in her eagerness to plan a wedding.

When the truth about Neriman being Murat's mother comes to light, the situation becomes even more complicated. While Neriman vehemently opposes Yaz becoming her daughter-in-law, Emine is determined to understand the unfolding events. In her attempt to ease the tension, she inadvertently gets herself entangled in the mess. Murat finds himself caught between the love he feels for Yaz and his loyalty towards his mother, leaving him in a perplexing dilemma. As Murat tries to resolve this situation, Kemal takes matters into his own hands and plans a surprise that could win Yaz over and put her at ease.

== Filming locations ==
The stunning scenery of Rize and the lively streets of Istanbul come to life in the amazing television series Yaz Şarkısı regarding the lives of Yaz and Murat, in important manners. Can, a charming musician from Istanbul, finds himself got to Rize's natural beauty and traditional music, while Yaz, a budding painter from Rize, is seduced by Istanbul's visual attraction to fulfil her father's aspiration. Their unplanned meeting inspires a group art work that recognizes the harmonious relationship between their two cultures.

== Cast and characters ==
Actor/Actress	Character
Nilsu Berfin Aktaş	Gülbeyaz "Yaz" Yıldırım
Mustafa Mert Koç	Kemal Sonay
Efekan Can	Murat Hasamaç
Oya Başar	Emine Yıldırım
Yeşim Ceren Bozoğlu	Neriman Hasamaç
Zehra Yılmaz	Aslı Paksoy
Duygu Karaca	Fadime Güzelce
Su Şanad	Mehpuş
Merve Sevin	Defne
Ömer Kılıç	Sedat
Selin Vardarlı	Sema Yıldırım

== Overview ==
Status: Ended
Number of Episodes	8
Start Date	9 June 2023
End Date	27 August 2023
Broadcasting Network	Fox (Turkish TV channel)

== Episodes ==
No.	Title	Directed by	Written by	Original release date
1	"Bolum"	Doğa Can Anafarta	Ramazan Demirli	July 9, 2023
Yaz is put in a challenging situation when Kemal, who is trying to convince the Smile Music CEO about the new vocal, arrives to the firm with Mehmet. Yaz is introduced to Mehmet by Kemal as a fresh vocalist. Although Yaz had rebuffed Kemal's attempts to sing the song with her, the circumstances are suddenly altered by their chance meeting. Yaz is all of a sudden involved in preparations for a video clip and poster shoot. During this period, Emine is also active and eager to meet her future daughter-in-law since she wants to be married as soon as possible.
2	"Bolum"	Doğa Can Anafarta	Zafer Özer Çetinel	July 16, 2023
Romantic partners constantly work to be in their being there, to improve their loved one's life, and to be in their presence at all times. quietly patiently, and without giving up hope, they wait to be noticed. But redemption does not always come at the end of waiting. Without being seen, they become enraged, yell without being heard, and begin tossing things around without being seen.
3	"Bolum"	Doğa Can Anafarta	Görkem Tüzünl	July 23, 2023
When it is discovered that Neriman is Murat's mother, things become tricky. Emine was having a hard time understanding what was going on when Neriman remarked, "I do not accept this girl as a bride." It would be one thing if he tried to defuse the situation by himself and got into problems. Murat already finds himself torn between his mother and his love. Kemal didn't wait about while he tried to find a solution to this problem; instead, he arranged a surprise that would influence Yaz and cheer him up.
4	"Bolum"	Doğa Can Anafarta	Görkem Tüzünl	July 30, 2023
Kemal has lost Yaz's trust as a result of Asl's plot. Yaz feels mistreated and tricked, and Murat is the only person who stands by her. Kemal must employ force when all other attempts to explain himself to Yaz are unsuccessful. Her actions will confuse Emine, who will believe that her daughter has abandoned her and fled. Emine smacks Yaz for the first time in her life, and the slap opens up old scars, heightening the tension between mother and daughter. Emine has chosen what she will do. He will vacate the Istanbul residence, take his daughter, and travel to Rize. Nearly everyone acknowledged the reality.
5	"What's Going On"	Doğa Can Anafarta	Görkem Tüzünl	August 6, 2023
While seeing both of Yaz and Kemal on stage shocked Emine, Murat's move saved the performance venue from disgrace. Murat, who is still getting to know Emine, is unsure of how far she can go. Murat and Yaz are separated after Emine locks Yaz at home and declares their marriage null and void. Murat's attempts to abduct Kemal.
6	"Love Confession"	Doğa Can Anafarta	Görkem Tüzünl	August 13, 2023
This time, Emine and Yaz's relationship is strained again because Yaz has run away from home. However, Emine has now lost her faith and trust in her daughter. While Yaz is torn between her mother and the Sinan issue, Murat is solely focused on Yaz. His attempt to improve her morale leads to a stronger bond between them, but Yaz intends to clear up the confusion between them. However, the next day, Alice, who comes to the company, will once again confuse Yaz's mind.
7	"What Will Do Now"	Doğa Can Anafarta	Görkem Tüzünl	August 20, 2023
Yaz and Kemal's adventure at the farmhouse has a profound effect on everyone. Doubts begin to surface regarding Murat and Yaz's alleged marriage, fueled especially by Neriman and Emine. As Murat tries to distance himself due to his heartache, Yaz finds herself grappling to uphold the falsehood. Turning to Kemal and Aslı for assistance with her plan, things take an unexpected turn, plunging her into a significant crisis.
8	"This Love Never End"	Doğa Can Anafarta	Görkem Tüzünl	August 27, 2023
Asli and Kemal's hiding of their past relationship shakes Yaz's trust. The thing that upsets Yaz the most is that Murat knows this fact and hides it from himself. While Kemal is looking for ways to apologize, Murat gives up everything and shares the whole truth with his mother. He tells Yaz that this is the right thing to do and he doesn't want to play anymore. It changes everything when he confesses his love to Yaz during this conversation.

== Externals links ==
- Yaz Şarkısı on FOX 's official site
- Yaz Şarkısı on YouTube
- Yaz Şarkısı on Threads
- Yaz Şarkısı on Instagram
- Yaz Şarkısı on Twitter
- Yaz Şarkısı on Facebook
- Yaz Şarkısı at IMDb
