= Island 54 =

Studio album by Stefflon Don
- Released: 28 June 2024
- Recorded: 2021–2024
- Genres: Dancehall; afrobeats; amapiano; R&B; soul
- Length: 1:05:00
- Labels: 54 London; BMG
- Producers: Stefflon Don; Kayzee; Nathan Butts; Tyree Hawkins; Al Cres; Beam; EQ; Gualtiero; Happy Colors; GuiltyBeatz; Gamz; Rz; Tudor Monroe; ADP; Alan Sampson; Sean 1da; Cole YoursTruly; 4stringz; AJ Productions; TSB; Scratch Made It; Hoops; CageGotThatCold; Rvssian; Drazy; Mr Hudson; Kofo; Euro; SAUCEboy; Dnny Phntm; TheBoyKam; Matt DiCarlantonio

Stefflon Don chronology
Secure (2018)	Island 54 (2024)

Singles from Island 54
- 1. "What's Poppin" Released: 11 August 2023; 2. "Intergalactic" Released: 17 January 2024; 3. "Dilemma" Released: 24 June 2024

Island 54 is the debut studio album by English rapper and singer Stefflon Don. It was released on 28 June 2024 through her record label 54 London in partnership with BMG Rights Management.

== Background and composition ==
In a review for The Guardian, the album is described as a 'quintessential summer record'—a “mythical 30-degree island” infused with diverse global sounds and possessive of polished, versatile production. Tracks like the introspective "Dem Evil", lovestruck amapiano cut "Control", sensual Afrobeats "What’s Poppin" that featured Nigerian singer Bnxn, "Desire" that featured French singer Tayc, and the Punjabi rap of "Dilemma" featuring the late Punjabi rapper Sidhu Moose Wala, Ghanaian producer GuiltyBeatz, and British producer Steel Banglez enhance its stylistic breadth.

== Singles and promotion ==
"What's Poppin" collaborated with Nigerian singer BNXN and its accompanying music video were released as the album's lead single on 11 August 2023. "Intergalactic" was released as the second single on 17 January 2024. And "Dilemma" collaborated with late Punjabi rapper Sidhu Moose Wala and its accompanying music video were released as the third single on 24 June 2024.

== Track listing ==
Island 54 track listing
No.	Title	Writer(s)	Producer(s)	Length
1.	"Top Toppa (Intro)"	Stephanie Allen; Almando Cresso; Kazeem Aderonmu; Nathan Butts; Tyree Hawkins; Tyshane Thompson	Kayzee; Nathan Butts; Tyree Hawkins; Al Cres	3:03
2.	"Dweet / Come Outside" (featuring Buju Banton)	Cresso; Marc Stultz; Mark Myrie; Thompson	Beam	4:45
3.	"Money Grip" (featuring Beam)	Allen; Ervin Quiroz; Hector Mendoza; Rajeev Sadhoe; Thompson	EQ; Gualtiero; Happy Colors	2:04
4.	"Dilemma" (featuring Sidhu Moose Wala)	Allen; Ronald Banful; Shubhdeep Sidhu	GuiltyBeatz	3:23
5.	"Solo"	Allen; Donel Mangena; Joshua Donkor; Aderonmu	Kayzee; Gamz	3:09
6.	"You Got Me F'd Up"	Allen; Savannah Jada; Aaron Donkor; Tudor Monroe	Rz; Monroe	2:48
7.	"Desire" (featuring Tayc)	Allen; Alan Sampson; Amish Patel; Chukwuka Ekweani; Julien Kamgang; Sophia Brennan	ADP; Sampson	2:23
8.	"Protect Me"	Allen; Donkor; Aderonmu	Kayzee; Gamz	3:07
9.	"Bulletproof"	Allen; Vania Khaleh-Pari; Cole Ostrin; Ejiro Sowule James; Sean Wander	Sean 1da; Cole YoursTruly; 4stringz	2:07
10.	"I Am Woman"	Allen; Aderonmu	Kayzee	3:54
11.	"What's Poppin" (featuring Bnxn)	Allen; Austin Jnr Iornongu Iwar; Alistair Martin; Daniel Benson; Ehijie Ohiomoba; Quinn Dillon	AJ Productions	3:15
12.	"Aspen"	Allen; Johnathan Bezianis; Aderonmu; Quinn Oulton; Thompson	Kayzee	3:03
13.	"Problems In Paradise" (featuring James Gillespie)	Allen; Ari PenSmith; Daj Jorden; James Gillespie; Aderonmu; Marco Bernardis; Meiko Wendt; Oluwatobi Oladigbolu; Phillip Plested	TSB	3:17
14.	"Brothers POV"	Allen; Edward Kesselly; Ohiomoba	Scratch Made It; AJ Productions	2:34
15.	"Madame Moisselle" (featuring D-Block Europe)	Allen; Adam Nathaniel Williams; Henri Velasco; Hritik Tushar Pattni; Ricky Banton	Hoops; CageGotThatCold	4:00
16.	"Intergalactic"	Allen; Tarik Luke Johnston	Rvssian	2:13
17.	"Dem Evil"	Allen; Benjamin Hudson McIldowie; Andre Morgan	Drazy; Mr Hudson	2:50
18.	"Different Sides" (featuring Adekunle Gold)	Allen; Adekunle Kosoko; Iwar; Jamal Europe; Kevin Ekofo; Oladigbolu	TSB; Kofo; Euro	2:52
19.	"Control"	Allen; Daniel James Wagner Cash; Kamyar Karimi-Abdolrezaei; Kazeem Aderonmu; Matt DiCarlantonio; Phillip Michael William Campbell; Raynford Humphrey; Tyrone Griffin, Jr.; Thompson	Stefflon Don; Kayzee; SAUCEboy; Dnny Phntm; TheBoyKam; DiCarlantonio	4:57
20.	"We Build"	Allen; Donkor; Aderonmu; Quinn Oulton; Vanessa Sylvester	Kayzee; Gamz	5:14
Total length:				1:05:00

== Charts ==
Chart performance for Island 54
Chart (2024)	Peak position
UK R&B Albums (Official Charts)	3
