= Calypso (Luis Fonsi and Stefflon Don song) =

Single by Luis Fonsi and Stefflon Don

from the album Vida
- Language: Spanish; English
- Released: June 14, 2018
- Genre: Latin pop; reggaeton
- Length: 3:19
- Label: Universal Latin; Universal
- Songwriter(s): Luis Fonsi; Dyo; Mauricio Rengifo; Andrés Torres; Stefflon Don
- Producer(s): Andrés Torres; Mauricio Rengifo

Luis Fonsi singles chronology
"Échame la Culpa" (2017)	"Calypso" (2018)	"Sigamos Bailando" (2018)

Stefflon Don singles chronology
"Senseless" (2018)	"Calypso" (2018)	"Diamond Body" (2018)

Music video
- "Calypso" on YouTube

"Calypso" is a song recorded by Puerto Rican singer and songwriter Luis Fonsi and English rapper and singer Stefflon Don. Fonsi co-wrote the song with Dyo, Stefflon Don and its producers Andrés Torres and Mauricio Rengifo. The song was first released through Universal Music Latin Entertainment on June 14, 2018 as the third single from his tenth studio album, Vida. A remixed version of the song with Colombian singer Karol G (in place of Don), was released on August 18, 2018. The song reached number one in Argentina and Chile, as well as the top 10 in Bolivia, Panama and Spain.

== Release ==
The track was released along with a music video on June 14, 2018. "Calypso" gained 1.7 million US streams and 5,000 downloads sold in the week ending June 21. The song's official video has more than 200 million views on YouTube since its release. The song is featured in the 2018 dance video game Just Dance 2019.

== Track listings ==
- Digital download
1. "Calypso" – 3:19
- CD single
1. "Calypso" – 3:20
2. "Calypso" (instrumental) – 3:20

== Charts ==
=== Weekly charts ===
Chart (2018)	Peak position
Argentina (Monitor Latino)	1
Bolivia (Monitor Latino)	6
Belgium (Ultratip Wallonia)	1
Chile (Monitor Latino)	1
Colombia (National-Report)	12
Dominican Republic (SODINPRO)	47
France Downloads (SNEP)	25
Italy (FIMI)	32
Panama (Monitor Latino)	2
Poland (Polish Airplay Top 100)	19
Puerto Rico (Monitor Latino)	1
Slovenia (SloTop50)	34
Spain (PROMUSICAE)	6
Sweden (Sverigetopplistan)	92
Switzerland (Schweizer Hitparade)	12
US Hot Latin Songs (Billboard)	23
US Latin Airplay (Billboard)	1
US Latin Rhythm Airplay (Billboard)	1
Venezuela (Monitor Latino)	17

Remix

Chart (2018)	Peak position
Argentina (Argentina Hot 100)	20
US Hot Latin Songs (Billboard)	11

=== Year-end charts ===
Chart (2018)	Position
Argentina (Monitor Latino)	15
Portugal Full Track Download (AFP)	114
Spain (PROMUSICAE)	38
Switzerland (Schweizer Hitparade)	71
US Hot Latin Songs (Billboard)	58

== Certifications ==
Region	Certification	Certified units/sales
Brazil (Pro-Música Brasil)	Platinum	40,000^{‡}
Italy (FIMI)	Platinum	50,000^{‡}
Mexico (AMPROFON)	Platinum	60,000^{‡}
Poland (ZPAV)	Gold	25,000^{‡}
Spain (PROMUSICAE)	2× Platinum	80,000^{‡}
^{‡} Sales+streaming figures based on certification alone.

== See also ==
- List of Billboard number-one Latin songs of 2018
