= Doug Clark and the Hot Nuts =

American band

Doug Clark and the Hot Nuts, also known as Doug Clark and his Hot Nuts, The Hot Nuts and, since the death of Doug Clark in 2002, Doug Clark's Hot Nuts, is an American rhythm and blues, rock and novelty band that has played party and club dates for more than fifty years. Starting in Chapel Hill, North Carolina, they became famous on the college circuit in the southeastern United States in the early 1960s for their risqué song lyrics and jokes, and for allegedly performing in various states of undress. Their signature song was "Hot Nuts". Other songs that they were known by included: "My Ding-a-Ling" (later a hit record by Chuck Berry), "Big Jugs" (based on "Big Bad John"), "He's Got the Whole World by the Balls", "Baby Let Me Bang Your Box", "The Bearded Clam", "Gay Caballero", and "Two Old Maids". Their first album had a picture of the band on the cover, with lead singer Prince Taylor "flipping the bird" to the audience. All of the Hot Nuts albums were on the Gross label, a subsidiary of Jubilee Records created solely for the band. Even though Jubilee published a line of 'party' records with risqué material, the Jubilee name did not appear anywhere on the Gross albums.

== Discography ==
- 1961 Nuts to You (Gross)
- 1963 On Campus (Gross)
- 1963 Homecoming (Gross)
- 1964 Rush Week (Gross)
- 1965 Panty Raid (Gross)
- 1966 Summer Session (Gross)
- 1967 Hell Night (Gross)
- 1968 Freak Out (Gross)
- 1969 With a Hat On (Gross)
