= Taves =

Taves is a surname. Notable people with the surname include:

- Ann Taves (born 1952), American religious studies scholar
- Ernest H. Taves (1916–2003), American psychiatrist and UFO skeptic
- Josh Taves (born 1972), American football player
