= The Second Wave (EP) =

EP by Ruger
- Released: 26 November 2021
- Length: 14:28 (standard edition); 24:34 (deluxe edition)
- Label: Jonzing; Sony; Promise Land; Columbia
- Producer: Kukbeatz

Ruger chronology
Pandemic (2021)	The Second Wave (2021)	Ru the World (2023)

Singles from The Second Wave
- 1. "Dior" Released: 14 April 2022

Deluxe edition cover
- The Second Wave (Deluxe)

Singles from The Second Wave (Deluxe)
- 1. "Girlfriend" Released: 4 August 2022

The Second Wave is the second Extended play by Nigerian singer Ruger. It was released on 26 November 2021 through Jonzing World and Sony Music UK, and features no guest appearances. Production was handled by Kukbeatz. The EP's deluxe edition was released on 17 June 2022. The Second Wave serves a follow-up to Pandemic (2021).

== Background ==
After the success of Ruger's previous EP, Pandemic released earlier that year, Ruger decided to release The Second Wave. He revealed the title and track list of the EP on 16 November 2021 via his Instagram.

He announced the release of the deluxe edition via a Twitter post where he stated he would add three new songs to the already acclaimed EP.

== Singles ==
The EP's only single "Dior" was released on 14 April 2022 alongside its music video which was directed by Topshotta. The lead single to the deluxe edition, "Girlfriend", was released on 4 August 2022 with an accompanying music video directed by TG Omori.

== Critical reception ==
Motolani Alake of Pulse Nigeria praised the Second Wave for showcasing Ruger’s confidence, growth, and deft songwriting, describing it as an improvement on his debut EP. He highlighted Ruger’s ability to find pockets in beats, his clever use of sexually charged lyrics, and the standout tracks "Dior", "Useless", and "Snapchat", which he predicted could become hits with proper promotion. Alake rated the EP 9.0/10, labeling it a "Champion", and noted that "profanity never felt so religious."

In a review for Afrocritik, music critic Emmanuel Daraloye praised the deluxe edition of the Second Wave for its sharp production, well-rounded writing, and versatility in delivery. He highlighted tracks like "Dior," which he called Ruger’s "most well-wrought song," and noted Ruger’s skillful balance of sexually charged lyrics and self-acclamation. Daraloye concluded that while the EP reinforces Ruger’s strengths, it doesn’t significantly elevate his artistry, rating it 6.5/10.

== Track listing ==
All tracks produced by Kukbeatz and written by Michael Olayinka.
No.	Title	Length
1.	"Champion"	3:45
2.	"Useless"	3:36
3.	"Snapchat"	3:26
4.	"Dior"	3:40

Deluxe edition bonus tracks
No.	Title	Length
5.	"Girlfriend"	3:16
6.	"WeWe"	2:53
7.	"Warning"	3:55
Total length:		24:34

== Charts ==
=== Weekly charts ===
Chart performance for The Second Wave
Chart (2021–2022)	Peak position
Nigerian Albums (TurnTable)	13

== Release history ==
Release history and formats for The Second Wave
Region	Date	Format	Label
Various	26 November 2021	Streaming; digital download	Jonzing; Sony; Promise Land; Columbia
