= Bad Since '97 =

2022 extended play by Bnxn

EP by Bnxn
- Released: 26 August 2022
- Genres: Afro-fusion; R&B; alternative pop
- Length: 20:47
- Producers: Bnxn (exec.): Abifade Tosin Tomide (Bayarn) (exec.); DNZL; Sak Pase; TSB; Juls; Blaisebeats; Steph

Bnxn chronology
Propeller (2022)	Bad Since '97 (2022)	Ocean (2022)

Singles from Bad Since '97
- 1. "Kenkele" Released: 22 July 2022; 2. "In My Mind" Released: 26 August 2022

Bad Since '97 is the second studio extended play by Nigerian singer-songwriter BNXN, formerly known as Buju. It was released on 26 August 2022 by TYE and distributed by Empire Distribution. The EP features guest appearances from Wizkid, Olamide and Wande Coal and combines elements from R&B, Afro Fusion, Afrobeats, and Afropop with Neo-soul percussive rhythms. Bad Since '97 received favourable reviews from critics, and topped charts In UK, US, Netherlands, and other countries.

== Critical reception ==
Professional ratings
Review scores
Source	Rating
Pulse Nigeria	6.9/10
Afrocritik	7/10

In a review for OkayAfrica, they wrote that "The project highlights BNXN's adaptability, lyrical intelligence, and development as a whole. His 24-year-development old's as an artist and dedication to promoting his skills internationally are demonstrated on it. His expanding fan base has further solidified the musician's expanding prominence in the music business."

In a review for Pulse Nigeria, Adebayo Adebiyi credited BNXN for "purposefully highlighting his accomplishments since the release of his debut tape in his second endeavour. In Bad Since '97, he asserts that he is an artist who possesses distinctive characteristics and audaciously compares the quality of his creativity to that of the tallest skyscraper in the world. The progression is nice despite the melody's predictability. Emmanuel Daraloye of Afrocritik calls it a well sequenced story and a resurgence of artistry.

== Track listing ==
No.	Title	Writer(s)	Length
1.	"Bad Since 97"	Daniel Benson	2:14
2.	"Bad Man Wicked"	Daniel Benson	2:51
3.	"Many Ways" (featuring Wizkid)	Daniel Benson & Ayodeji Ibrahim Balogun	3:47
4.	"Kenkele" (featuring Wande Coal)	Daniel Benson & Oluwatobi Wande Ojosipe	3:34
5.	"In My Mind"	Daniel Benson	2:18
6.	"Modupe" (featuring Olamide)	Daniel Benson & Olamide	3:54
7.	"Loose Emotions"	Daniel Benson	2:45
Total length:			20:47

== Charts ==
Chart performance for Bad Since '97
Chart (2022)	Peak position
Nigeria Albums (TurnTable)	14

== Personnel ==
Credits adapted from Spotify.

- Daniel Benson - Primary artist, writer.
- Abifade Tosin Tomide (Bayarn) - Executive producer
- DNZL - Production (1)
- Sak Pase - Production (1, 4, 6)
- TSB - Production (2)
- Juls - Production (3)
- Blaisebeats - Production (5 & 7)
- Steph - Production (6 & 7)

== Release history ==
Region	Date	Format	Version	Label	Ref
Various	August 26, 2022	CD, digital download	Standard	TYE; Empire Distribution	
