= Hurtin' Me =

Single by Stefflon Don featuring French Montana

from the album Hurtin' Me - The EP and Secure
- Released: 10 August 2017
- Genre: Dancehall
- Length: 3:32
- Label: Polydor
- Songwriters: Karim Kharbouch; Rymez; Stephanie Victoria
- Producer: Rymez

Stefflon Don singles chronology
| "Instruction" (2017) | "Hurtin' Me" (2017) | "Ding-a-Ling" (2017) |

French Montana singles chronology
| "A Lie" (2017) | "Hurtin' Me" (2017) | "Phases" (2017) |

Remix cover
- Cover of the remix featuring Sean Paul, Popcaan and Sizzla

Sean Paul singles chronology
| "She Call Me" (2017) | "Hurtin' Me" (Remix) (2018) | "Mad Love" (2018) |

Popcaan singles chronology
| "New Money" (2017) | "Hurtin' Me" (Remix) (2018) | "Head Bad" (2018) |

Sizzla singles chronology
| "Shock Out" (2017) | "Hurtin' Me" (Remix) (2018) | "Nasty Bwoy" (2018) |

Music video
- "Hurtin' Me" on YouTube

"Hurtin' Me" is a song by English rapper Stefflon Don featuring American rapper French Montana released on 10 August 2017 as the lead single from Don's debut EP of the same name. The song peaked at number seven on UK Singles Chart in November 2017, becoming the rapper's highest-charting single to date and first to reach the top 10. Don provided her first televised performance of "Hurtin' Me" by being the musical guest on the third episode of BBC's Sounds Like Friday Night, hosted by American singer Demi Lovato, who also performed "Instruction" with her and Jax Jones. The rapper performed the single also at the Capital's 2017 Jingle Bell Ball, BBC Radio 1's Big Weekend 2018 in Swansea, Wales and Summertime Ball 2018. A remix version featuring Jamaican musicians Sean Paul, Popcaan and Sizzla was released on 12 January 2018. The remix is included on her mixtape, Secure (2018), which was released on 17 August 2018.

== Music video ==
The song's accompanying music video premiered on 1 September 2017 on Stefflon Don's Vevo account on YouTube. The video was directed by Luke Biggins and Don herself. In less than two months, the video gained over 17 million views on YouTube and as of November 2022, has over 204 million.

== Remix ==
A remix of the song featuring Sean Paul, Popcaan and Sizzla was released 12 January 2018.

== Track listing ==
- Digital download
1. "Hurtin' Me" (featuring French Montana) – 3:32
- Digital download: Hurtin' Me (The Remix)
1. "Hurtin' Me" (The Remix) (featuring Sean Paul, Popcaan and Sizzla) – 4:01
- Digital download: Hurtin' Me – The EP
1. "Hurtin' Me" (The Remix) (featuring Sean Paul, Popcaan and Sizzla) – 4:01
2. "Hurtin' Me" (featuring French Montana) – 3:32
3. "Ding-a-Ling" (with Skepta) – 3:07
4. "16 Shots" – 3:44

== Charts ==
=== Weekly charts ===
| Chart (2017–2018) | Peak position |
|---|---|
| Ireland (IRMA) | 78 |
| Scotland Singles (Official Charts) | 12 |
| UK Singles (Official Charts) | 7 |
| UK Hip Hop/R&B (Official Charts) | 2 |
| US Bubbling Under Hot 100 (Billboard) | 19 |
| US Rhythmic Airplay (Billboard) | 12 |

=== Year-end charts ===
| Chart (2017) | Position |
|---|---|
| UK Singles (Official Charts Company) | 94 |

== Certifications ==
| Region | Certification | Certified units/sales |
|---|---|---|
| Canada (Music Canada) | Gold | 40,000^{‡} |
| France (SNEP) | Gold | 100,000^{‡} |
| New Zealand (RMNZ) | Platinum | 30,000^{‡} |
| United Kingdom (BPI) | 2× Platinum | 1,200,000^{‡} |
^{‡} Sales+streaming figures based on certification alone.
