= Nilsu Berfin Aktaş =

Turkish actress

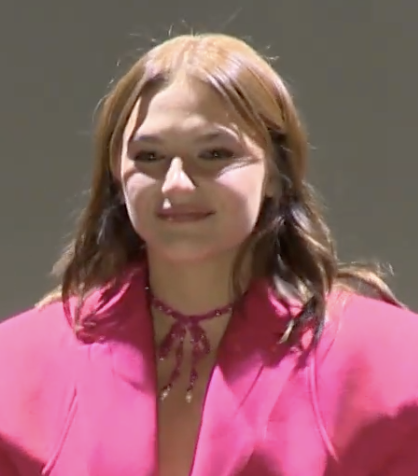
- Education: Yetenek Evi Sanat Akademisi (Talent House Art Academy)
- Occupation: Actress
- Years active: 2018–present
- Spouse: Serdar Sertçelik (m. 2021; div. 2023)

Nilsu Berfin Aktaş (born 17 August 1998) is a Turkish actress.

== Life and career ==
She was born in Ankara on 17 August 1998. Aktaş, who graduated from the Talent House Art Academy, was recognized in the competition titled Future Star, which was published in 2018. Between 2019 and 2021, she played the leading role in the TV series Kuzey Yıldızı İlk Aşk, directed by Ersoy Güler and broadcast on Show TV. In 2021, she played the leading role in the TV series Benim Hayatım, which was broadcast on Star TV and directed by Onur Tan. She played in the TV series Gelsin Hayat Bildiği Gibi, which was broadcast on Show TV between 2022 and 2023. On December 4, 2022, she was awarded in the "Shining Star" category at the Golden Butterfly Awards. She played the leading role in the TV series called Yaz Şarkısı, which aired on NOW in 2023, as the character "Gülbeyaz / Yaz Yıldırım". Finally, in 2024, she played the leading role as "İnci Sağlam" in the TV series titled "Korkma Ben Yanındayım", produced by Medyapım and broadcast on NOW.

=== Personal life ===
Nilsu Berfin Aktaş married Serdar Sertçelik, who is a businessman living in Ankara. The couple divorced by mutual consent on 14 July 2023.

== Filmography ==
Televizyon
Year	Production	Role	Channel
2018	Geleceğin Starı	Herself/Finalist	Star TV
2019–2021	Kuzey Yıldızı İlk Aşk	Gökçe Mollaoğlu	Show TV
2021	Benim Hayatım	Hayat	Star TV
2022	Kalp Yarası	Pınar	atv
2022	O Ses Türkiye Yılbaşı Özel	Herself	TV8
2022–2023	Gelsin Hayat Bildiği Gibi	Gizem Demirci	Show TV
2023	Yaz Şarkısı	Gülbeyaz / Yaz Yıldırım	FOX
2024	Korkma Ben Yanındayım	İnci Sağlam	NOW
2024–2025	Şakir Paşa Ailesi: Mucizeler ve Skandallar	Ayşe	NOW
2026	Aynı Yağmur Altında	Rosa	atv
Internet
Year	Production	Role	Platform
2021	Ölüm Zamanı	Dilara	Exxen
Yakında	Ayna	Deniz	Disney+
Cinema
Year	Production	Role	Director
2025	Aşk Sadece Bir An	Hayal	Mustafa Kotan
2027	Bazı Aşklar Yarım Kalır	Ela	Ekin Pandır

Advertisements
Year	Company
2019	Cornetto
2019	Çetmen Mobilya
2019	Fuse Tea
2019	Lifecell
2021	Pantene
2021	misli.com

== Awards and nominations ==
Yıl	Organisation	Category	Production	Result
2022	48. Golden Butterfly Awards	Shining Stars	Gelsin Hayat Bildiği Gibi	Won
2023	49. Golden Butterfly Awards	Best Romantic Comedy Actress	Yaz Şarkısı	Nominated
