= Bum Bum Tam Tam =

2017 song by MC Fioti

Single by MC Fioti
- Released: 8 March 2017
- Recorded: 2017
- Genre: Funk carioca
- Length: 2:50
- Label: Universal Latino; Island
- Songwriter: Leandro Ferreira
- Producer: Lucas Junior

MC Fioti singles chronology
"Vai Toma" (2016)	"Bum Bum Tam Tam" (2017)	"Você Me Deixou" (2017)

Music video
- "Bum Bum Tam Tam" on YouTube

"Bum Bum Tam Tam" (also known by the title "Joga O Bum Bum Tam Tam") is a song recorded by Brazilian funk rapper MC Fioti. The music video was released on 8 March 2017. The song samples Johann Sebastian Bach's Partita in A minor for solo flute. The song has peaked at number one in the Netherlands and the top 5 in France.

The song's music video is currently the most viewed video from Brazil on YouTube.

Due to the similarity in sonority between "Bum Bum Tam Tam" and Instituto Butantan, the institute responsible for one of the COVID-19 vaccines to be distributed in Brazil, MC Fioti released a new version of the song in 2021, Vacina Butantan ("Butantan vaccine"). The modified lyrics incentive people to take the vaccine and was recorded inside the facilities of Instituto Butantan with employees dancing. One week after being posted, the video had amassed over six million views on YouTube.

== Critical reception ==
The song received widespread critical acclaim from music critics. Billboard said the song "might just qualify as the biggest international banger the world has ever seen." Clash described the song saying "'Bum Bum Tam Tam' is the carefree phenomenon 2017 needs, the sort of ear-worm pop melody that can bring entire nations together." Vice described the song questioning if "Bum Bum Tam Tam is the best funk song in history?"

== Music video ==
The official music video was released on 8 March 2017 on the KondZilla channel. It cost R$30,000 (Roughly US$7,700) to make. According to Fioti, "It was all last minute and it was perfect."

As of September 2025, the video has over 1.9 billion views and 15 million likes on YouTube. It is also the most-viewed Brazilian music video and the first to hit 1 billion views.

== Track listing ==
Digital download
No.	Title	Length
1.	"Bum Bum Tam Tam"	2:50

== Charts ==
Chart performance for "Bum Bum Tam Tam" by MC Fioti
Chart (2017–2018)	Peak position
Switzerland (Schweizer Hitparade)	54
France (SNEP)	5
Netherlands (Single Tip)	1
Spain (Promusicae)	87

== Release history ==
Region	Date	Format	Label	Ref.
Various	8 March 2017	Digital download	Island	

== Remixes ==
=== Future, J Balvin, Stefflon Don and Juan Magán Remix ===
"Bum Bum Tam Tam" (remix)

Single by MC Fioti, Future, J Balvin, Stefflon Don, Juan Magán
- Released: 15 December 2017
- Recorded: 2017
- Genre: Dance; funk paulista; hip hop
- Length: 3:35
- Label: Island
- Songwriters: Leandro Ferreira; Nayvadius Wilburn; José Osorio; Stephanie Allen; Juan Magán
- Producer: Lucas Junior

MC Fioti singles chronology
"Band Life" (2017)	"Bum Bum Tam Tam" (remix) (2017)	"Engatilha e bum" (2018)

Future singles chronology
"Patek Water" (2017)	"Bum Bum Tam Tam" (remix) (2017)	"King's Dead" (2018)

J Balvin singles chronology
"Downtown" (2017)	"Bum Bum Tam Tam" (remix) (2017)	"Machika" (2018)

Stefflon Don singles chronology
"Ding-A-Ling" (2017)	"Bum Bum Tam Tam" (remix) (2017)	"Alone" (2018)

Juan Magán singles chronology
"Dejaté llevar" (2017)	"Bum Bum Tam Tam" (remix) (2017)	"Le encanta" (2018)

Music video
- "Bum Bum Tam Tam" (Remix) on YouTube

"Bum Bum Tam Tam (Remix)" was recorded alongside Colombian singer J Balvin, American rapper Future, British rapper Stefflon Don, and Spanish singer Juan Magán. It was released on 15 December 2017 through Island Records and Universal Music.

=== Other versions ===
A version by Jonas Blue was released in March 2018. ClashMusic.com described this version as a "fiery Friday anthem".

A version by Jax Jones was released in January 2018. Billboard has ranked the remix as one of the best Dance/Electronic remixes of 2018. Billboard also said of the song, "Jax Jones ships the record straight to the club, adding a bassy four-on-the-floor beat while letting the flutes shine."

A version by David Guetta was released on April 27, 2018. As described by Billboard, "Guetta gives Fioti's anthem a big, boisterous intro and some serious snare drum, plus a few electronic elements to let you know you've arrived at the middle of the megaclub dance floor."

A version by MC Fioti was released in January 2021, in the context of the 2019-2021 coronavirus pandemic, incentivizing people to take the COVID-19 vaccine developed in partnership with Instituto Butantan.

=== Track listing ===
Bum Bum Tam Tam (Remix)
No.	Title	Length
1.	"Bum Bum Tam Tam (Remix)"	3:33

Jonas Blue Remix
No.	Title	Length
1.	"Bum Bum Tam Tam" (Jonas Blue Remix)	3:06

Jax Jones Remix
No.	Title	Length
1.	"Bum Bum Tam Tam" (Jax Jones Remix)	3:28

David Guetta Remix
No.	Title	Length
1.	"Bum Bum Tam Tam" (David Guetta Remix)	4:09

=== Charts and certifications ===
==== Weekly charts ====
Chart (2017–18)	Peak position
Belgium (Ultratop 50 Flanders)	17
Belgium (Ultratip Bubbling Under Wallonia)	2
Brazil Streaming (Pro-Música)	48
Colombia (National-Report)	32
Costa Rica (Monitor Latino)	12
Ecuador (National-Report)	33
France (SNEP)	8
Germany (GfK)	51
Greece International Digital (IFPI Greece)	78
Honduras (Monitor Latino)	5
Italy (FIMI)	42
Nicaragua (Monitor Latino)	10
Spain (Promusicae)	9
Switzerland (Schweizer Hitparade)	51
Venezuela (National-Report)	18
US Hot Latin Songs (Billboard)	23

==== Year-end charts ====
Chart (2018)	Position
Belgium (Ultratop Flanders)	64
France (SNEP)	34
Italy (FIMI)	83
Spain (PROMUSICAE)	69
US Hot Latin Songs (Billboard)	66

==== Certifications ====
Region	Certification	Certified units/sales
Belgium (BRMA)	Gold	10,000^{‡}
Brazil (Pro-Música Brasil)	5× Diamond	1,500,000^{‡}
France (SNEP)	Diamond	233,333^{‡}
Germany (BVMI)	Gold	200,000^{‡}
Italy (FIMI)	Platinum	50,000^{‡}
Mexico (AMPROFON)	Diamond+2× Platinum	420,000^{‡}
Spain (Promusicae)	2× Platinum	80,000^{‡}
United Kingdom (BPI)	Silver	200,000^{‡}
United States (RIAA)	6× Platinum (Latin)	360,000^{‡}
^{‡} Sales+streaming figures based on certification alone.

=== Release history ===
Region	Date	Format	Version	Label	Ref.
Various	15 December 2017	Digital download	Original	Island; Universal	
Italy	12 February 2018	Contemporary hit radio	Original	Universal	
Various	23 February 2018	Digital download	Jonas Blue Remix	Island; Universal	
Various	16 March 2018	Digital download	Jax Jones Remix	Island; Universal	
United States	27 March 2018	Rhythmic contemporary radio	Original	Aftercluv; UMLE	
Various	27 April 2018	Digital download	David Guetta Remix	Island; Universal	
Various	23 January 2021	YouTube	Vacina Butantan		

== Certifications ==
Region	Certification	Certified units/sales
Belgium (BRMA)	Gold	10,000^{‡}
Brazil (Pro-Música Brasil)	5× Diamond	1,500,000^{‡}
France (SNEP)	Diamond	233,333^{‡}
Germany (BVMI)	Gold	200,000^{‡}
Italy (FIMI)	Platinum	50,000^{‡}
Mexico (AMPROFON)	Diamond+2× Platinum	420,000^{‡}
Spain (Promusicae)	2× Platinum	80,000^{‡}
United Kingdom (BPI)	Silver	200,000^{‡}
United States (RIAA)	6× Platinum (Latin)	360,000^{‡}
^{‡} Sales+streaming figures based on certification alone.
