= Ruger (musician) =

Nigerian singer-songwriter (born 1999)

- Born: Michael Adebayo Olayinka; 23 September 1999 (age 27); Lagos, Nigeria
- Genres: Afrobeats; afro-pop; dancehall
- Occupations: Singer-songwriter; musician
- Years active: 2020–present
- Label: Blown Boy Entertainment

Michael Adebayo Olayinka (born 23 September 1999), known professionally as Ruger is a Nigerian singer-songwriter and performing artist. He rose to fame with the release of his song "Bounce", which led him to sign a recording deal with Jonzing World, in 2021. That same year, he released his debut EP, Pandemic. In 2024, he left Jonzing World to start his own imprint, called 'Blown Boy Entertainment'. Ruger attended Police Secondary School Akure and graduated in 2017.

He notably wears an eyepatch over his left eye in his performances. The eyepatch symbolizes aiming down the sights of a gun in reference to the Ruger firearms he takes his name from.

== Early life ==
Michael Adebayo Olayinka was born on 23 September 1999 in Lagos, where he was also raised. He is originally from Yagba West Local Government Area in Kogi State, Nigeria. He sang in church choir earlier in life.

== Career ==
Olayinka was discovered by D'Prince, who gave him the name "Ruger". His first song recorded seventy million views in three days. In January 2021, D'Prince announced the signing of Ruger to Jonzing World and Sony Music Entertainment UK, in a joint venture with Columbia Records.

He released the song "One Shirt" with Rema in January 2021. In February 2021, he released "Ruger", a single from first EP, PANDEMIC.

"Bounce" became a hit song from Pandemic and debuted at number 39 on the Top 50 chart Nigeria and was listed at number 20 on the TurnTable End of the Year chart and number 2 on the Apple Music top Afrobeats songs. On 26 November 2021, he released his second EP, titled The Second Wave, with "Dior" as the lead single, which debuted number 32 on the Top 50 chart, and number 15 on the UK Afrobeats Singles Chart.

On 19 November 2021, he released his second EP, The Second Wave, produced by Kukbeatz. The song "Dior" reached number 32 on the Top 50 chart, and number 15 on the UK Afrobeats Singles Chart. 2021 AFRIMMA (African Muzik Magazine Awards) nominated RUGER for Best NewComer 2021 2021 AFRIMA (All Africa Music Awards) nominated Ruger for Best Artiste, Duo or Group in African Reggae, Ragga or Dancehall and Most Promising African Artiste of the year.

In November 2022, Ruger released the hit single "Asiwaju", which peaked at number 1 on Nigeria's Apple Music chart and spent a record-breaking one month at the top.

In February 2023, Ruger was named Best New Artist at the Soundcity MVP Awards which were held at the Eko Convention Centre in Lagos.

In September 2023, Ruger released his debut album, Ru the World.

In April 2024, Ruger and Bnxn released the collaborative mixtape RnB. The mixtape's lead single, Romeo Must Die, debuted at number 11 on the Billboard Afrobeat chart.

In August 2026, Ruger released his six-track EP, R.U. (Raw & Unfiltered, Vol. 1). The project explores a blend of Afrobeats, Afro-fusion, and Amapiano while incorporating cross-border collaborations, featuring South African artists Musa Keys and Young Stunna on the track "Do Nothing" and MC Morena on "Private Chef". Accompanying the release, Ruger stated that the project was a more personal, introspective creative chapter crafted independently of outside expectations.

== Discography ==
=== Singles ===
As lead artist
Year	Title	Album
2021	"Ruger"	Pandemic
2021	"Bounce"	Pandemic
2021	"Dior"	The Second Wave
2021	"Girlfriend"	The Second Wave
2022	"Snapchat"	The Second Wave (Deluxe)
2022	"WeWe"	The Second Wave (Deluxe)
2022	"Red Flags"	Ru the World
2022	"Asiwaju"	Ru the World
2023	"Jonzing Boy"	Ru the World
2023	"Luv Again"	TBA
2024	"Make Way"	TBA
2025	"Muhammad Ali (Can't Relate)"	TBA

=== Albums ===
List of Albums, with selected details
Title	Album details
Ru the World	Released: September 2023; Label: Jonzing World; Formats: Digital download, streaming
BlownBoy RU	Released: March 2025; Label: Blownboy Entertainment; Formats: Digital download, streaming

=== EPs ===
List of Ep, with selected details
Title	Album details
Pandemic	Released: March 4, 2021; Label: Jonzing World, Sony Music UK; Formats: Digital download, streaming
The Second Wave	Released: November 2021; Label: Jonzing World, Sony Music UK; Formats: Digital download, streaming
R.U. (Raw & Unfiltered, Vol. 1).	Released: August 7, 2026 Blownboy Entertainment under exclusive license to Promised Land Recordings Limited

=== Collaborative EP ===
- RnB (with Bnxn) (18 April 2024, Blown Boy Entertainment, TYE Entertainment, and Empire Distribution)
