= Secure (mixtape) =

Mixtape by Stefflon Don
- Released: 17 August 2018
- Genres: Hip-hop; dancehall
- Length: 49:11
- Labels: 54 London; Quality Control; Polydor
- Producers: Rymez; Pioladitingancia; DJ Esco; Leftside; Tiggs da Author; KZ; Sokari; J. White Did It; Laquan Green; Prgrshn; Razor on the Track; DJ Khaled

Stefflon Don chronology
Hurtin' Me – The EP (2018)	Secure (2018)	Island 54 (2024)

Singles from Secure
- 1. "Senseless" Released: 18 May 2018; 2. "Pretty Girl" Released: 8 August 2018

Secure is the second mixtape by English rapper and singer Stefflon Don. It was released on 17 August 2018, by 54 London. The mixtape features guest appearances from Future, Ebenezer, Fekky, Haile (from the group WSTRN), Sean Paul, Popcaan, Sizzla, and DJ Khaled. It includes the singles "Senseless" and "Pretty Girl" featuring Tiggs da Author.

== Background and release ==
On 28 May 2018, Don released "Senseless" as the lead single from her upcoming mixtape, which peaked at 65 on the UK Singles Chart. In June 2018, Don revealed that the title of her upcoming mixtape would be Real Tings 2, which included a collaboration with American rapper Future. While performing at Terminal 5 in New York City on 11 July for the 2018 XXL Freshman show, Don said that she would be releasing her second mixtape Secure on 3 August, however it was not released until 17 August 2018.

The mixtape's second single "Pretty Girl" featuring Tiggas Da Author was released on 8 August 2018, peaking at 85 in the UK. On that same day, the mixtape's artwork leaked and it was revealed it pays homage to Lil Kim's The Notorious K.I.M., which sparked tension with rapper Foxy Brown, who blocked Don on Instagram following the leak.

Three days following the release of the second single, Don released the freestyle "Oochie Wally", however the song does not appear on the final track listing of the mixtape. Don then released two promotional singles, "What You Want" with Future and "Lil Bitch", the latter of which came with an accompanying video.

== Artwork ==
Stefflon Don drew inspiration for this mixtape cover from Lil' Kim's The Notorious K.I.M. album cover.

== Track listing ==
Secure track listing
No.	Title	Writer(s)	Producer(s)	Length
1.	"Lil Bitch"	Stephanie Allen; Rodney Hwingwiri	Rymez	1:42
2.	"Jellio"	Allen; Hwingwiri	Rymez	3:06
3.	"Finesse"	Allen; Hwingwiri	Rymez	2:24
4.	"Interlude"	Allen; Jonathan Sosa	Rymez; Pioladitingancia	1:02
5.	"What You Want" (with Future)	Allen; Nayvadius Wilburn; Hwingwiri; R.Ridgley; William Moore	Rymez; DJ Esco	4:28
6.	"Pretty Girl" (featuring Tiggs da Author)	Allen; Jason Julian; Adam Simon; Craig Parks	Leftside; Tiggs da Author	3:14
7.	"Uber" (featuring Ebenezer)	Allen; Ebenezer; Hwingwiri	Rymez	3:48
8.	"Precious Heavy"	Allen; Hwingwiri	Rymez	2:53
9.	"Both Ways" (featuring Fekky)	Allen; Fekky; KZ; Sokari	KZ; Sokari	4:00
10.	"Crunch Time"	Allen; Anthony White; Laquan Green; Jordan Thorpe	J. White Did It; Green	2:34
11.	"Favourite Girl" (featuring Haile)	Allen; Haile Alexander; Ras Kassa Alexander	PRGRSHN; Razor on the Track	3:22
12.	"Hurtin' Me" (The Remix) (featuring Sean Paul, Popcaan and Sizzla)	Allen; Kharim Kharbouch; Hwingwiri	Rymez	4:01
13.	"Senseless"	Allen; Hwingwiri	Rymez	3:03
14.	"Regular"	Allen; Hwingwiri	Rymez	4:04
15.	"Win" (with DJ Khaled)	Allen; Khaled Khaled; Hwingwiri	Rymez; DJ Khaled	3:23
16.	"Free Drip Tony Montana (Online)"	Allen; Hwingwiri; Ashley Charles	Rymez	2:07
Total length:				49:11

== Charts ==
Chart performance for Secure
Chart (2018)	Peak position
UK Albums (Official Charts)	35
