= Bnxn =

Nigerian singer and songwriter (born 1997)

- Also known as: Buju, Bujutoyourears, BNXN
- Born: Daniel Etiese Benson; 14 May 1997 (age 29); Lagos, Nigeria
- Genres: Afro-fusion; Afrobeats
- Occupations: Singer; songwriter
- Years active: 2018–present
- Labels: Spaceship Records (former); To Your Ears Entertainment (T.Y.E)

Daniel Etiese Benson (born 14 May 1997), known professionally as Bnxn (pronounced "Benson") and formerly known as Buju, is a Nigerian singer, songwriter and record producer.

== Early life ==
Daniel Etiese Benson was born in Lagos. He hails from Akwa Ibom State and grew up in Gbagada with his family before relocating to Ogun State. He was introduced to Afropop through Nigerian music artist 2Baba as a child and credits Burna Boy as his inspiration for becoming a musical artist.

== Career ==
Buju released the extended play Sorry I'm Late on 27 October 2021, under the management of T.Y.E/EMPIRE and spaceship entertainment. It featured guest appearances from the Nigerian highlife duo, The Cavemen, and production from Steph, Perlz, Denzl, Timi Jay and Rexxie. It was mixed and mastered by Vtek and Poppil. Motolani Alake of Pulse Nigeria said that it "projects confidence, wins and 'comfort". Buju performed his first show in London on 30 November, marking the beginning of his Sorry I'm Late tour.

On 22 December 2021, Buju headlined his first sold-out concert, which was also his debut concert in Lagos, held at Balmoral Convention Centre, Lagos.

In 2022, Buju officially changed his name to BNXN to avoid confusion with Buju Banton and having more unique branding. In March 2022, he collaborated with Pheelz on the single "Finesse"; the song peaked at number 52 on the UK Official Singles Chart. In July 2022, he featured on the Jae5 song "Propeller" alongside British rapper Dave. The song became Bnxn's first Top 40 single in the United Kingdom, entering the chart at number 38.

On 24 August 2022, Bnxn released an EP titled Bad Since '97. The EP features guest appearances from Wizkid, Olamide and Wande Coal. On 4 September 2022, Bnxn won the Next Rated awards at The Headies 2022, held at the Cobb Energy Performing Arts Centre in Atlanta, Georgia, United States.

On 4 October 2023, Bnxn released his debut album, Sincerely, Benson. The album comprises 15 songs, and features guest appearances from Headie One and Popcaan.

In 2024, Bnxn released a collaborative EP with Ruger titled RnB, following a previous feud between the two artists. It comprises seven songs.

Bnxn released his sophomore album "Captain" in early July 2025. The album featured collaborations with top Afropop artists including Seyi Vibez, Victony, FOLA, Rema, and the Soweto Gospel Choir. He also shared plans to embark on a North American tour in August.

In early April 2026 , he released Back Outside, The lead single off of his collaborative Ep with Sarz named ' The Game Needs Us' It was released on May 11th and had a total of 5 songs.

He released a solo Ep on 30th September with 6 songs , Asake and Fola acting as the only features on the project

== Discography ==
=== Studio albums ===
- Sincerely, Benson (2023)
- Captain (2025)

=== Extended plays ===
- Sorry I'm Late (2021)
- Bad Since ’97 (2022)
- Still In Charge (2026 )

=== Collaborative EP ===
- RnB (with Ruger) (18 April 2024, Blown Boy Entertainment, TYE Entertainment, and Empire Distribution)
- The Game Needs Us ( with Sarz) (2026)

=== Singles ===
Year	Title	Reference
2018	"Catch a Vibe"	
2018	"Wahala"	
2019	"Energy"	
2019	"Commander"	
2019	"Spiritual" (featuring Zlatan)	
2019	"L'enu"	
2019	"Ohema & TMXO"	
2020	"So Lovely"	
2020	"Lenu Remix" (featuring Burna Boy)	
2021	"Outside"	
2021	"Testimony"	
2021	"Italy" (featuring Blaq Diamond)	
2022	"Kenkele" (featuring Wande Coal)	
2025	"Cutesy"	
2025	"Very Soon" (with FOLA)	
2026	"Back Outside" (featuring sarz)	

=== As featured artist ===
List of singles as featured artist, with selected chart positions and certifications, showing year released and album name
Title	Year	Peak chart positions						Certifications	Album
Title	Year	NG	US Global	UK	UK R&B	UK Afrobeats	ZA	Certifications	Album
"Feeling" (Ladipoe featuring Buju)	2021	—	—	—	—	—	—		Providence
"Bling" (Blaqbonez featuring Amaarae and Buju)	2021	—	—	—	—	—	—		Sex Over Love
"Alubarika" (Zlatan featuring Buju)	2021	—	—	—	—	—	—		Non-album singles
"Confident" (Savage featuring Buju)	2021	—	—	—	—	—	—		Non-album singles
"Mood" (Wizkid featuring Buju)	2021	—	—	—	—	—	—	BPI: Silver	Made in Lagos
"Your Body" (Basketmouth featuring Buju)	2021	—	—	—	—	—	—		Non-album singles
"Times Two" (Wani featuring Buju)	2021	—	—	—	—	—	—		Non-album singles
"Cold Outside" (Timaya featuring Buju)	2021	—	—	—	—	—	—		Non-album singles
"Sweet Daddy" (Remix) (Dai Verse featuring Buju)	2022	—	—	—	—	—	—		Non-album singles
"Saloo" (Remix) (Kashcoming featuring Buju)	2022	—	—	—	—	—	—		Non-album singles
"Hustle" (Reminisce featuring Buju and D Smoke)	2022	—	—	—	—	—	—		Non-album singles
"Finesse" (Pheelz featuring Buju)	2022	1	131	52	28	1	31	BPI: Silver	Non-album singles
"Propeller" (Jae5 featuring Dave and Bnxn)	2022	—	—	38	—	—	—	BPI: Silver	Non-album singles
"Ocean" (B Young featuring Bnxn)	2022	—	—	—	—	—	—		Non-album singles
"Pray 2 The East" (M Huncho featuring Bnxn fka Buju)	2022	—	—	—	—	—	—		Non-album singles
"—" denotes a recording that did not chart or was not released in that territory.

== Awards and nominations ==
Year	Event	Prize	Recipient	Result	Ref
2019	The Headies 2020	Rookie	Himself	Nominated	
2020	City People Entertainment Awards	Revelation of the Year	Himself	Won	
2021	AFRIMMA	African Fan Favourite	"Outside" ^{[A]}	Nominated	
2021	AFRIMMA	Best Artist or Duo Group	Ladipoe featuring Buju – "Feeling" ^{[A]}	Nominated	
2021	AFRIMMA	Best African Rapper or Lyricist	Ladipoe featuring Buju – "Feeling"^{[A]}	Nominated	
2021	AFRIMMA	Best Promising Artiste	"Outside" ^{[A]}	Nominated	
2021	AFRIMMA	Best Artiste, Duo or Group in African Hip Hop	Blaqbonez – "Bling" featuring Amaarae and Buju) ^{[A]}	Nominated	
2022	Grammy Awards	Best Global Music Album	Made in Lagos Deluxe Edition by Wizkid	Nominated	
2022	The Headies 2022	Next Rated	Himself	Won	
2022	The Headies 2022	Best Rap Single	"Feeling" – Ladipoe feat. Bnxn	Won	
2023	Soundcity MVP Awards	Best Collaboration	"Finesse"	Won	
