= Stefflon Don =

British rapper (born 1991)

- Stefflon Don In 2024
- Born: Stephanie Victoria Allen; 14 December 1991 (age 34); Birmingham, West Midlands, England
- Occupations: Rapper; singer; songwriter; businesswoman
- Organization: Don Beauty
- Works: Discography
- Children: 2
- Relatives: Dutchavelli (brother)
- Musical career
- Origin: Clapton, London, England
- Genres: Hip hop; dancehall; grime; R&B
- Instruments: Vocals
- Years active: 2013–present
- Labels: BMG; 54 London; Quality Control
- Website: officialstefflondon.com

Stephanie Victoria Allen (born 14 December 1991), known professionally as Stefflon Don, is an English rapper. She rose to fame with her 2017 single "Hurtin' Me" (featuring French Montana), which peaked at number seven on the UK Singles Chart. In 2016, Allen released her debut mixtape Real Ting, followed by her second, Secure (2018). She released her debut studio album, Island 54, in 2024.

== Early life and education ==
Allen was born in Birmingham, West Midlands, and is of Jamaican descent. She has seven siblings, one of them being rapper Dutchavelli. When she was five years old, Allen's family moved to Rotterdam, South Holland; as a result, she is fluent in Dutch. She has been singing and writing music since primary school. At the age of nine, she recorded a "Hard Knock Life" hook for rapper U-Niq. The song was never released, but Allen was surprised to hear her voice on the playback. At the age of 14, she returned to Britain to study at a London school. She worked as a cake decorator and hairdresser before her career in music.

== Career ==
=== 2015–2017: Career beginnings ===
Don first surfaced in 2015 by releasing a cover of Wretch 32's "6 Words" and went on to be featured on tracks such as Lethal Bizzle's "Wobble", Sneakbo's "Work" remix, Angel's "Hop On", and KSI's 2016 song "Touch Down", which appears on the soundtrack of the 2017 film Baywatch. "Fashion Killa (Papapapa)" by Mason, released on 16 August 2016, was written by Don and Mason (Iason Chronis). Don made her first appearance on an American song with the track "London" by singer Jeremih, and was later featured on Lil Yachty's "Better" from the album Teenage Emotions. On 16 December 2016, Don released her first mixtape titled Real Ting.

In the spring of 2016, Don was signed to 54 London a subsidiary of Universal Music Group that was created just for her. A few months later, she was featured on the dancehall track "Instruction" with Jax Jones and Demi Lovato. The trio performed the song live for the first time in June 2018 at the Summertime Ball.

On 15 August 2017, she released the lead single "Hurtin' Me" (featuring French Montana) from her debut EP titled Hurtin' Me – The EP, which reached number 7 on the UK Singles Chart. The EP was later released on 12 January 2018.

On 29 November, Don took home the award for Best Female Act at the 2017 MOBO Awards.

=== 2018–present: Secure and current projects ===
In March 2018, Don appeared on the front cover of the final print edition in the 66-year run of NME.

In March 2018, Don was featured on the remix for American singer Halsey's "Alone" along with American rapper Big Sean. The song peaked at number 66 on the Billboard Hot 100, becoming her first entry on the chart, and also earned Don her first Dance Club Songs number one. The music video was released on 6 April 2018.

In March 2019, Don was featured on the remix for Mariah Carey's song "A No No" from her 2018 album Caution.

In June 2018, Don was included in the XXL Freshman Class. On 17 August 2018, Don released her second mixtape Secure.

In March 2019, she collaborated with Wiley on the song "Boasty".

In July 2019, her vocals were featured on XXXTentacion's posthumous track "Royalty".

On 25 August 2021, Don was featured on the "Girl Power remix" of "Kiss My (Uh-Oh)" by Anne-Marie and Little Mix along with Raye and Becky Hill.

On 4 June 2022, she participated in the Platinum Party at the Palace, performing with Jax Jones and Nandi Bushell, to mark the Platinum Jubilee of Elizabeth II.

In June 2023, she visited and paid her respects to the late rapper Sidhu Moose Wala at the village of Moosa in Punjab, India. Don previously collaborated with Sidhu on the song "47" in 2019 as well as "Invincible" in 2021. 47 reached No. 17 on the UK Singles Chart, and Invincible reached No. 35 on the New Zealand Hot.

In 2024, Don contributed to the soundtrack of Arcane: Season 2, providing vocals for the track "Renegade".

== Personal life ==
She gave birth to her first child, a son named Jaylen, at 17 years old in 2008. On April 26, 2026, she gave birth to her second child, a son named Don Claes.

She is the sister of rapper Dutchavelli, singer and media personality Shemara London, and singer Princess Diamz.

Allen dated Nigerian singer Burna Boy from 2018 to 2022.

In September 2019, she held a giveaway on Twitter after reaching a billion streams as an artist. British artist Shocka reached out to her, stating that he was in Nigeria for cancer treatment for his mother. She decided to gift him the money for his mother's treatment.

== Other ventures ==
In October 2025, Stefflon Don launched her fragrance line Don Beauty.

== Discography ==
Studio albums

- Island 54 (2024)

Mixtapes

- Real Ting (2016)
- Secure (2018)

== Awards and nominations ==
Awards and nominations received by Stefflon Don
Year	Award	Category	Work	Result
2017	MOBO Awards	Best Female	Herself	Won
2018	NME Awards	Best New Artist	Herself	Won
2018	BET Awards	Best International Act	Herself	Nominated
2019	Berlin Music Video Awards	Best VFX	Boasty	Nominated
