= List of Nigerian Grammy Award winners and nominees =

The following is a list of Grammy Awards winners and nominees from Nigeria:

Artists who won or were nominated for their original work
Year	Category	Work	Artist	Result
1984	Best Ethnic or Traditional Folk Recording	Syncro System	King Sunny Adé	Nominated
1998	Best World Music Album	Love Drum Talk	Babatunde Olatunji	Nominated
1999	Best World Music Album	Odu	King Sunny Adé	Nominated
2002	Best Pop Vocal Album	Lovers Rock	Sade	Won
2003	Best World Music Album	Fight to Win	Femi Kuti (Note: Femi Kuti was born in England and grew up in Nigeria.)	Nominated
2010	Best Contemporary World Music Album	Day by Day	Femi Kuti	Nominated
2012	Best World Music Album	Africa for Africa	Femi Kuti	Nominated
2014	Best World Music Album	No Place for My Dream	Femi Kuti	Nominated
2019	Best World Music Album	Black Times	Seun Kuti & Egypt 80	Nominated
2020	Best World Music Album	African Giant	Burna Boy	Nominated
2021	Best World Music Album	Twice as Tall	Burna Boy	Won
2022	Best Global Music Album	Made in Lagos Deluxe Edition	Wizkid	Nominated
2022	Best Global Music Album	Legacy +	Femi Kuti and Made Kuti	Nominated
2022	Best Global Music Performance	"Essence"	Wizkid featuring Tems	Nominated
2022	Best Global Music Performance	"Pà Pá Pà"	Femi Kuti	Nominated
2023	Best Global Music Performance	"Last Last"	Burna Boy	Nominated
2023	Best Global Music Album	Love Damini	Burna Boy	Nominated
2024	Best Global Music Album	Timeless	Davido	Nominated
2024	Best Global Music Performance	"Feel"	Davido	Nominated
2024	Best African Music Performance	"Unavailable"	Davido	Nominated
2024	Best African Music Performance	"Rush"	Ayra Starr	Nominated
2024	Best African Music Performance	"Amapiano"	Asake and Olamide	Nominated
2024	Best African Music Performance	"City Boys"	Burna Boy	Nominated
2024	Best Melodic Rap Performance	"Sittin' on top of the World"	Burna Boy	Nominated
2024	Best Global Music Album	I Told Them...	Burna Boy	Nominated
2025	Best African Music Performance	"Tomorrow"	Yemi Alade	Nominated
2025	Best African Music Performance	"MMS"	Asake and Wizkid	Nominated
2025	Best African Music Performance	"Higher"	Burna Boy	Nominated
2025	Best African Music Performance	"Love Me JeJe"	Tems	Won
2025	Best R&B Song	"Burning"	Tems	Nominated
2025	Best Global Music Album	Born in the Wild	Tems	Nominated
2025	Best Global Music Album	Heis	Rema	Nominated
Artists who won or were nominated for their guest contributions
Year	Category	Foreign work and artist	Nigerian act	Result
1991	Best World Music Album	Planet Drum	Babatunde Olatunji	Won
2015	Album of the Year	Beyoncé by Beyoncé (Note: Beyoncé is an American singer and Chimamanda Ngozi Adichie, a Nigerian, appears as a featured artist on one of the songs on the album.)	Chimamanda Ngozi Adichie	Nominated
2017	Album of the Year	Views by Drake (Note: Drake is a Canadian musician and Wizkid, a Nigerian, appears as a featured artist and co-producer on one of the songs on the album.)	Wizkid	Nominated
2017	Best Dance Recording	"Rinse & Repeat" by Riton (Note: Riton is an English musician and Kah-Lo, a Nigerian, appears as a featured artist on the song.)	Kah-Lo	Nominated
2021	Best Music Video	"Brown Skin Girl" by Beyoncé, Saint Jhn & Wizkid featuring Blue Ivy Carter	Wizkid	Won
2009	Best Contemporary World Music Album	Global Drum Project by Various artists (Note: The album features a number of different artists from around the world, primarily Mickey Hart, Zakir Hussain, Sikiru Adepoju and Giovanni Hidalgo)	Sikiru Adepoju	Won
2022	Best Global Music Performance	"Do Yourself" by Angélique Kidjo featuring Burna Boy	Burna Boy	Nominated
2022	Album of the Year	Justice Triple Chucks Deluxe by Justin Bieber (Note: Justin Bieber is a Canadian musician and Burna Boy, a Nigerian, appears as a featured artist on one of the songs on the album.)	Burna Boy	Nominated
2023	Best Rap Song	"Wait For U" by Future featuring Drake and Tems	Tems	Nominated
2023	Best Melodic Rap Performance	"Wait For U" by Future featuring Drake and Tems	Tems	Won
2023	Album of the Year	Renaissance by Beyoncé	Tems	Nominated
2024	Best Song Written for Visual Media	"Lift Me Up" by Rihanna	Tems	Nominated
2025	Best African Music Performance	"Sensational" by Chris Brown	Davido and Lojay	Nominated
