= King Sunny Adé discography =

This is the discography of the modern Nigerian world music artist King Sunny Adé, whose career has spanned more than forty years.

== Discography ==
| Number | Title | Record Company | Song writer | Year |
|---|---|---|---|---|
| 1 | Yekinni Akande b/w Col. Adéyinka Adébayo | African Songs | King Sunny Adé | 1967 |
| 2 | Ewo Ijamba Motto | African Songs | King Sunny Adé | 1967 |
| 3 | Omo Oba Sijuwade | African Songs | King Sunny Adé | 1967 |
| 4 | Layiwola Folashade | African Songs | King Sunny Adé | 1967 |
| 5 | Olalekan Salami b/w Challenge Cup '67 | African Songs | King Sunny Adé | 1968 |
| 6 | "Mini-Woho" | African Songs | King Sunny Adé | 1968 |
| 7 | Awa Arawa | African Songs | King Sunny Adé | 1968 |
| 8 | An W'oba | African Songs | King Sunny Adé | 1968 |
| 9 | Alli Mekudi | African Songs | King Sunny Adé | 1968 |
| 10 | Col. Benjamin Adékunle | African Songs | King Sunny Adé | 1968 |
| 11 | Alujonu Onijita | African Songs | King Sunny Adé | 1968 |
| 12 | Ibilekeleke | African Songs | King Sunny Adé | 1970 |
| 13 | Eda nreti Eleya | African Songs | King Sunny Adé | 1970 |
| 14 | Oluku | African Songs | King Sunny Adé | 1970 |
| 15 | Egbe Igbimo b/w Sewelude | African Songs | King Sunny Adé | 1970 |
| 16 | Mo gbinla mi soko | African Songs | King Sunny Adé | 1970 |
| 17 | Mo gbinla mi soko | African Songs | | 1970 |
| 18 | Ibi Ise bari | African Songs | King Sunny Adé | 1970 |
| 19 | Alanu L'Oluwa* | African Songs | King Sunny Adé | 1970 |
| 20 | London Special – London La Wa | African Songs | King Sunny Adé | 1970 |
| 21 | Soyoyo | African Songs | King Sunny Adé | Unknown |
| 22 | Ajo jobiile | African Songs | King Sunny Adé | Unknown |
| 23 | Igbalaye | African Songs | King Sunny Adé | Unknown |
| 24 | Ija Pari | African Songs | King Sunny Adé | 1971 |
| 25 | Akanji Adé Fowope | African Songs | King Sunny Adé | Unknown |
| 26 | New Sound of Sunny Adé | African Songs | King Sunny Adé | Unknown |
| 27 | Olowo (part 1) b/w Olowo (part 2) | African Songs | King Sunny Adé | Unknown |
| 28 | Tony Clarke | African Songs | King Sunny Adé | Unknown |
| 29 | Awa Arawa | African Songs | King Sunny Adé | Unknown |
| 30 | Ibilekeleke | African Songs | King Sunny Adé | Unknown |
| 31 | Mo gbinla mi soko | African Songs | King Sunny Adé | Unknown |
| 32 | Egbe Awawa | African Songs | King Sunny Adé | Unknown |
| 33 | Nkuruma/Nibi Taiye Bayi Si | African Songs | King Sunny Adé | Unknown |
| 34 | Sunny Ti De/A Kunle A Tewo Adura | African Songs | King Sunny Adé | Unknown |
| 35 | In The Heart of Great Britain/Ile Labo Sinmi Oko/Sehindemi | African Songs | King Sunny Adé | Unknown |
| 36 | Ogun (By Popular Request/Chief Bolarinwa Abioro ) | African Songs | King Sunny Adé | Unknown |
| 37 | Mr. Adénaike (Ololu)/Prince Adésanya | African Songs | King Sunny Adé | Unknown |
| 38 | Late Dr. Nkrumah/Sunny Special | African Songs | King Sunny Adé | 1972 |
| 39 | Ogun (in full)/ Our New Sound | African Songs | King Sunny Adé | 1972 |
| 40 | Late Pa Yohanna Gowon/Asalamu-Alaikun | African Songs | King Sunny Adé | Unknown |
| 41 | Sunny Ti De / Kolawole Bockersteth | African Songs | King Sunny Adé | Unknown |
| 42 | Afai Bawon Ja/Omo Wumi | African Songs | | 1972 |
| 43 | Ogidan Ko Ni Se Barber/ Ibanuje Mo Niwon/ Ariya Odun Kewa | African Songs | King Sunny Adé | 1973 |
| 44 | Sunny Tide / Oro T'Onlo | African Songs | King Sunny Adé | 1972 |
| 45 | Synchro System Movement | African Songs | King Sunny Adé | Unknown |
| 46 | E Kilo F'Omo Ode/ Esubiri Ebo Mi | Sunny Alade | King Sunny Adé | 1974 |
| 47 | Mo Ti Mo/ Kileni Ase | Sunny Alade | King Sunny Adé | 1975 |
| 48 | Late Gen Murtala Mohammed | Sunny Alade | King Sunny Adé | 1976 |
| 49 | Live Play | Sunny Alade | King Sunny Adé | 1976 |
| 50 | Synchro System | Sunny Alade | King Sunny Adé | 1977 |
| 51 | Sunny in London/Emi Agbadura | African Songs | King Sunny Adé | 1977 |
| 52 | Sound Vibration/ Kiti-Kiti | Sunny Alade | King Sunny Adé | 1977 |
| 53 | Araiye E Dakun | Sunny Alade | King Sunny Adé | 1978 |
| 54 | Private Line/365 Is My Number | Sunny Alade | King Sunny Adé | 1978 |
| 55 | FESTAC 77 | Sunny Alade | King Sunny Adé | 1978 |
| 56 | Isu Joba Lori Iyan | Sunny Alade | King Sunny Adé | 1978 |
| 57 | The Royal Sound/Ariya Is Unlimited | African Songs | King Sunny Adé | 1979 |
| 58 | I'm Searching for My Love | Sunny Alade | King Sunny Adé | 1979 |
| 59 | Omode o Mela/Ori Mi Ja Fun Mi | Sunny Alade | King Sunny Adé | 1980 |
| 60 | Eje Nlogba/ Oba Okunade Sijuade | Sunny Alade | King Sunny Adé | 1980 |
| 61 | Juju Music of the 80s/Ara n funmi/Osupa Mi Tole | Sunny Alade | King Sunny Adé | 1981 |
| 62 | The Message/ Ma J'Aiye Oni | Sunny Alade | King Sunny Adé/ | 1981 |
| 63 | Check E/ Ki Isu To Diyan | Sunny Alade | King Sunny Adé | 1981 |
| 64 | Ariya Special/ A Gbe Kini Ohun De | Sunny Alade | King Sunny Adé | 1981 |
| 65 | Omode o mela/Ja Funmi | Sunny Alade | King Sunny Adé | 1980 |
| 66 | The Message | Sunny Alade | King Sunny Adé | 1982 |
| 67 | Maa Jo | Sunny Alade | King Sunny Ad] | 1982 |
| 68 | Ijinle Odu | Sunny Alade | King Sunny Adé | 1982 |
| 69 | Ja Funmi | Sunny Alade | King Sunny Adé | 1982 |
| 70 | Live At Montreux | Sunny Alade | King Sunny Adé | 1982 |
| 71 | Juju Music | Mango | King Sunny Adé | 1982 |
| | Synchro System | Mango | King Sunny Adé | 1983 |
| 77 | Ajoo | Sunny Alade | King Sunny Adé | 1983 |
| 78 | Synchro Feelings | Sunny Alade | King Sunny Adé | 1983 |
| 79 | Bobby | Sunny Alade | King Sunny Adé | 1983 |
| 80 | Synchro Series | Sunny Alade | King Sunny Adé | 1983 |
| 81 | Conscience | Sunny Alade | King Sunny Adé | 1983 |
| 82 | Ase/ Ogunja | Sunny Alade | King Sunny Adé | 1983 |
| 83 | Explosion | Sunny Alade | King Sunny Adé | 1984 |
| 84 | Togetherness | Sunny Alade | King Sunny Adé | 1984 |
| 85 | Aura | Island Records | King Sunny Adé | 1984 |
| 86 | Ase | Island Records | King Sunny Adé | 1984 |
| 87 | Gratitude | Sunny Alade | King Sunny Adé | 1985 |
| 88 | The Truth | Sunny Alade | King Sunny Adé | 1985 |
| 89 | Saviour | Sunny Alade | King Sunny Adé | 1985 |
| 90 | Sweet Banana | Sunny Alade | King Sunny Adé | 1986 |
| 91 | My Dear | Sunny Alade | King Sunny Adé | 1986 |
| 92 | Saviour | Sunny Alade | King Sunny Adé | 1985 |
| 93 | Let Them Say | Sunny Alade | King Sunny Adé | 1986 |
| 94 | Jealousy | Sunny Alade | King Sunny Adé | 1987 |
| 95 | Merciful God | Sunny Alade | King Sunny Adé | 1987 |
| 96 | The Return of the Juju King | Sunny Alade | King Sunny Adé | 1987 |
| | The Good Shepherd | | King Sunny Ade | 1988 |
| 97 | The Child | Sunny Alade | King Sunny Adé | 1988 |
| 98 | Destiny | Sunny Alade | King Sunny Adé | 1988 |
| 99 | Live Live Juju | Sunny Alade | King Sunny Adé & His African Beats | 1988 |
| 100 | Choices/Sunny Adé Ti E Nreti | Sunny Alade | King Sunny Adé | 1989 |
| 101 | Authority | Sunny Alade | King Sunny Adé | 1990 |
| 102 | Get Up | Sunny Alade | King Sunny Adé | 1990 |
| 103 | Return Of The Juju King Volume 2 | Sunny Alade | King Sunny Adé | 1990 |
| 104 | Triumph | Broadway | King Sunny Adé | 1992 |
| 105 | Surprise | Sigma Park | King Sunny Adé | 1992 |
| 106 | Glory | Sunny Alade | King Sunny Adé | 1993 |
| 107 | King Sunny Adé & The New African Beats | Hemisphere/IRS | King Sunny Adé | 1994 |
| 108 | The Way Forward | Sigma Park | King Sunny Adé | 1994 |
| 109 | E Dide/Get Up | MESA | King Sunny Adé | 1995 |
| 110 | E Dide/Get Up | Master Disc | King Sunny Adé | 1995 |
| 111 | My Dream | Sigma Disk | King Sunny Adé | 1996 |
| 112 | The Golden Age / Otunba Iyiola Omisore | Sigma Disk | King Sunny Adé | 1997 |
| 113 | Ogun | Aladdin | King Sunny Adé | 1997 |
| 114 | Odu | Mesa/Atlantic Records | King Sunny Adé | 1998 |
| 115 | His Evergreen Hits | African Songs | King Sunny Adé | 1998 |
| 116 | Fantasia '98 World Tour | Sunny Alade | King Sunny Adé | 1999 |
| 117 | Ariya Is Unlimited | Sigma Park | King Sunny Adé | 1982 |
| 118 | Live At The Hollywood Palace | Sunny Alade | King Sunny Adé | 1999 |
| 119 | Kool Samba | Master Disk | King Sunny Adé | 1999 |
| 120 | Seven Degrees North | Sunny Alade | King Sunny Adé | 2000 |
| 121 | Owanbe/ 0805 Is My Number | Fortune Records | King Sunny Adé | 2003 |
| 122 | Juju-Apala Live | Fortune Records | King Sunny Adé | 2000 |
| 123 | Divine Shield/ Otunba Reuben Famuyibo | Master DIsk | King Sunny Adé | 2004 |

== See also ==
- Juju Music

Baba motunde- 2010
