= Aura (King Sunny Adé album) =

Studio album by King Sunny Adé
- Released: 1984
- Genre: Jùjú
- Label: Mango
- Producer: Martin Meissonnier

King Sunny Adé chronology
| Synchro System (1983) | Aura (1984) | The Return of the Juju King (1987) |

Aura is a studio album by the Nigerian jùjú musician King Sunny Adé, released in 1984. It is credited to King Sunny Adé and His African Beats.

Unlike Adé's previous two Mango Records albums, Aura did not make the Billboard 200. Mango dropped Adé after its release, and Adé broke up His African Beats.

== Production ==
The album was produced by Martin Meissonnier. Stevie Wonder contributed harmonica to "Ase". Aura employed five guitarists and six drummers, including Tony Allen.

== Critical reception ==
Professional ratings
Review scores
| Source | Rating |
|---|---|
| AllMusic | 4/5 stars |
| Robert Christgau | A |
| The Encyclopedia of Popular Music | 3/5 stars |
| MusicHound Rock: The Essential Album Guide | 4/5 stars |
| The Rolling Stone Album Guide | 4.5/5 stars |
| Spin Alternative Record Guide | 9/10 |

Trouser Press thought that "the rhythm tracks are almost pure beatbox in style... The vocal harmonies in [Adé's] work have a distinctive Latin feel." The Philadelphia Inquirer called the album "subtly hypnotic, captivating," writing that "layer over layer of intricate rhythm is combined with swerving melodies, skirling guitar parts and the call-and-response chanting that is the heart of 'juju' music." Jon Pareles, of The New York Times, listed Aura at number two on his list of the 10 best albums of 1984.

AllMusic wrote that, "once again, Adé and a battery of guitarists are particularly impressive, laying down a wealth of nicely integrated solos; as with earlier Adé recordings, the pedal steel work is especially stunning." Mojo deemed the album "even groovier" than Synchro System. Miami New Times argued that, "because Aura's cutting-edge songs blended poorly with its more traditional Yoruban-based pieces, it ended up sounding more foreign than his other American LPs."

== Track listing ==
| No. | Title | Length |
|---|---|---|
| 1. | "Ase" |
| 2. | "Gboromiro" |
| 3. | "Ogunja" |
| 4. | "Oremi" |
| 5. | "Ire" |
| 6. | "Iro" |

== Personnel ==
- King Sunny Adé – guitar, vocals
- Ademola Adepoju – steel guitar
- Tony Allen – drums
