= Jazz Journalists Association =

International organization of media professionals

- Abbreviation: JJA
- Founded: 1987; 38 years ago
- Key people: Howard Mandel (president)
- Website: news.jazzjournalists.org

The Jazz Journalists Association (JJA), founded in 1987, is an international organization of all types of media professionals who document, promulgate, or appreciate jazz. As of 2016, it has approximately 250 members, including professional journalists, students, industry associates and supporting institutions, primarily in North America but also on other continents. The mission of the association is "to promote high standards and respect for our works, to create a professional network, and to increase general interest in jazz". It is a 501(c)(3) non-profit corporation. The president of the association (as of 2016) is jazz writer Howard Mandel.

The organization was founded after writers and broadcasters involved in jazz convened in 1987 in Chicago, United States. Since then, the JJA has held meetings and panel discussions, frequently coinciding with major jazz festivals around North America, and online activities including its eyeJAZZ video training webinars. It established a website, www.Jazzhouse.org, in 1996, and in 2007 transferred activities to JJANews.org and Members.jazzjournalists.org; the JJA also maintains Facebook pages for specific activities. The JJA's quarterly journal, Jazz Notes, is archived at JJANews.org along with new content. JJANews focuses on business-to-business information, for journalists and others professionally involved in jazz.

== Awards ==
In 1997, the Association, with producer Michael Dorf, then of the Knitting Factory, founded the Jazz Awards, which are presented for excellence in both music and music journalism. Originally the awards were presented at a party in New York each June; as of 2014 the awards for music are announced April 15 and presented by JJA members to musicians at their performances throughout the US. The awards for journalism and media are announced and presented at a party in June in New York.

In 2010 the JJA established a media campaign called "Jazz April" to celebrate Jazz Appreciation Month (as declared by the Smithsonian Institution) culminating in International Jazz Day (established by UNESCO with support from the Thelonious Monk Institute of Jazz). The JJA Jazz Awards were streamed as live video in 2010 and 2011; those programs are archived in their entirety at UStream.com.
