= Odu =

Odu may refer to

- Odu (album), a 1998 album by Nigerian musician King Sunny Adé
- Odù, another name for the Yoruba deity, Oduduwa.
- Odu, shirt name of Nigerian footballer Nnamdi Oduamadi (born 1990)
- Odù Ifá, sacred corpus of the Yoruba religion.
- O Du people, an aboriginal ethnic group in Vietnam and Laos

== See also ==
- ODU (disambiguation)
- Odus (disambiguation)
