= Sorry, Sorry (Femi Kuti song) =

"Sorry, Sorry" is a 1998 Femi Kuti song from the album Shoki Shoki. It is one of his best known tunes. The lyrics are a complaint against Africa's leaders and military rulers.

== Remixes ==
- "Sorry Sorry," from Hotel Costes: La Suite (French CD, Pschent 543 361 2)
