= International Jazz Day =

International event for the promotion of jazz music

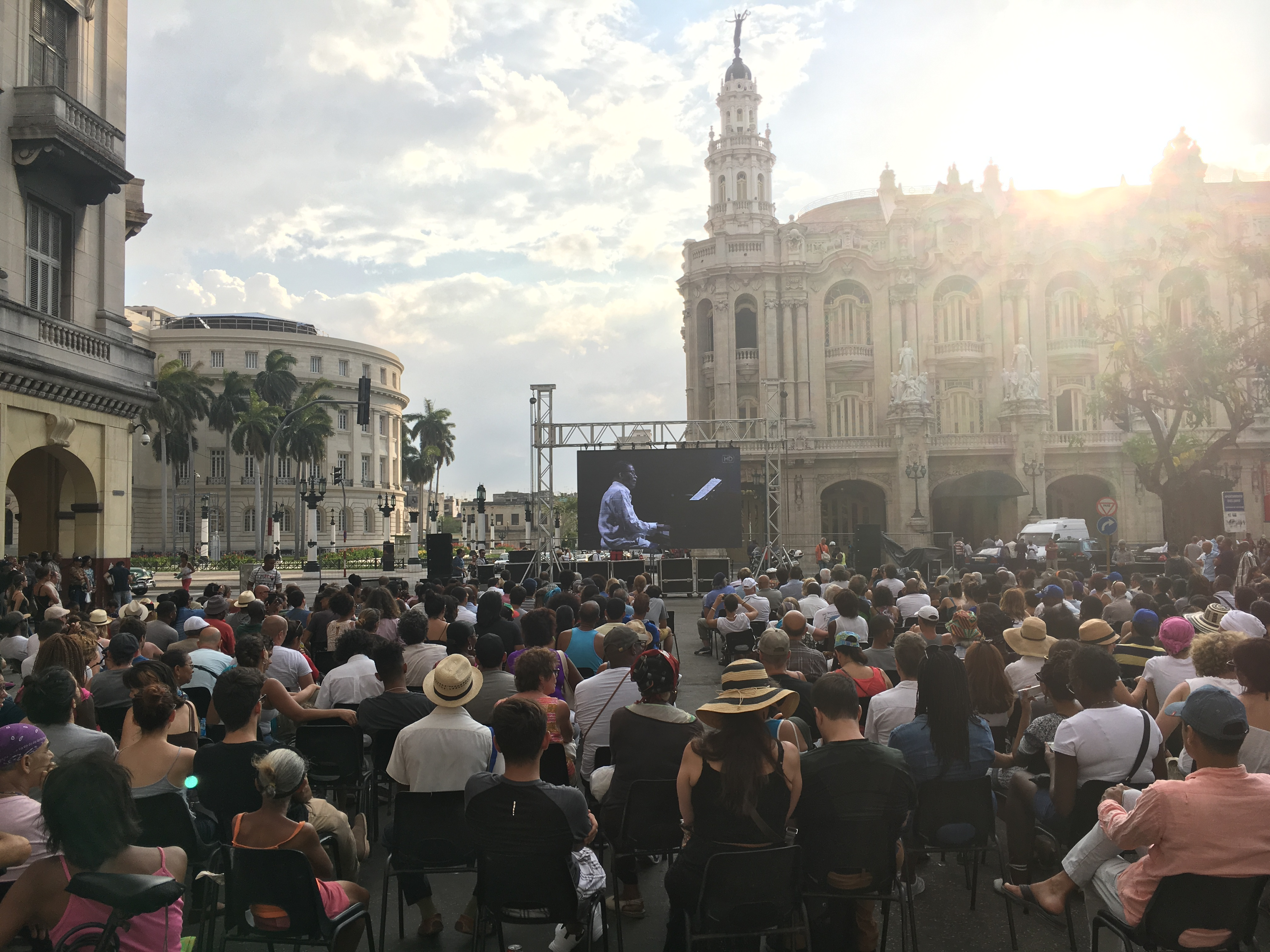
- UNESCO Goodwill Ambassador Herbie Hancock performs during the International Jazz Day All-Star Global Concert simulcast in Havana, Cuba, April 30, 2017.
- Observed by: All UNESCO Member States
- Type: International
- Significance: Celebrates jazz music's influence in promoting peace and intercultural dialogue
- Date: April 30
- Next time: April 30, 2027
- Frequency: Annual
- First time: April 30, 2012
- Related to: Jazz

International Jazz Day is an International Day declared by the United Nations Educational, Scientific and Cultural Organization (UNESCO) in 2011 "to highlight jazz and its diplomatic role of uniting people in all corners of the globe." It is celebrated annually on April 30. The idea came from jazz pianist and UNESCO Goodwill Ambassador Herbie Hancock. Jazz Day is chaired by Hancock and the UNESCO Director-General. The celebration is recognized on the calendars of both UNESCO and the United Nations.

The Herbie Hancock Institute of Jazz (formerly the Thelonious Monk Institute of Jazz), an American NGO also chaired by Hancock, is the lead organizational partner for Jazz Day. The Institute coordinates activities in the UNESCO member states as well as the Global Host Celebration. Events in the Host City culminate in an All-Star Global Concert, which involves numerous jazz musicians from around the world performing in or around an historical landmark.

The 2022 celebration of International Jazz Day featured an All-Star Global Concert at the United Nations General Assembly Hall, with Herbie Hancock, Gregory Porter, Shemekia Copeland, Marcus Miller, Mark Whitfield, Hiromi, Linda Oh, David Sanborn, Randy Brecker, Ravi Coltrane, Zakir Hussain, Brian Blade and others.

== Worldwide participation ==
Nearly 200 countries participate in International Jazz Day every year. In addition to concerts and jam sessions, events include workshops, conferences, and community outreach. The official registry of worldwide events is hosted on jazzday.com where they are displayed and indexed alphabetically by country. Jazzday.com lists notable examples of events organized over the past ten years:

- A teacher in Tuscaloosa organized a workshop on how to use jazz to inspire leadership and innovation.
- A venue in Bogotá, Colombia, produced a day of public education programs including classes, concerts, and jam sessions.
- In Yangon, Myanmar, organizers invited a jazz guitarist to give performances and educational workshops with local musicians.
- A conservatory in Kathmandu, Nepal, hosted local and traveling musicians for joint concerts, followed by an open jam session. The event was broadcast live on the radio.
- A record producer in Tehran, Iran, organized a series of concerts with local musicians at an historic cultural center.
- A mobile jazz club in Alcoy, Spain, attempted to set the record for largest jazz jam session in Spanish history, bringing together more than 100 musicians in Alcoy's Plaza de Dins.
- A planetarium in Ukraine hosted a jazz concert accompanied by a 3D-video show.

The International Jazz Day website also collects jazz education materials. These include content from the Smithsonian Institution in the United States, Jazz at Lincoln Center, the New York Jazz Workshop, Jamey Aebersold Jazz, the Herbie Hancock Institute of Jazz, Norwegian music technology firm oiid, the online STEAM curriculum Math, Science & Music, and the Universidad Veracruzana.

== Jazz and cultural expression ==
UNESCO's official description of International Jazz Day places the annual celebration in the context of the 2005 Convention on the Protection and Promotion of the Diversity of Cultural Expressions, maintaining that Jazz Day "integrates culture in sustainable development frameworks", "promotes human rights and fundamental freedoms", and "protects and promote the diversity of cultural expressions."

== History ==
=== Inception and declaration ===
After his designation as a UNESCO Goodwill Ambassador for Intercultural Dialogue on July 22, 2011, Herbie Hancock announced his intention to create an International Day celebrating the diplomatic role of jazz. In November 2011, following a favorable recommendation by the 187th Executive Board, UNESCO's General Conference proclaimed April 30 as International Jazz Day, recognizing jazz as "a means to develop and increase intercultural exchanges and understanding between cultures for the purpose of mutual comprehension and tolerance." The date of April 30 was proposed to position International Jazz Day as the culmination of the Smithsonian Institution's April Jazz Appreciation Month (JAM), though no formal connection exists between JAM and International Jazz Day.

The United Nations General Assembly formally recognized International Jazz Day on its official calendar in December 2012.

=== Paris, New Orleans, New York ===
The inaugural International Jazz Day celebration took place in three parts. On April 27, Hancock hosted a daylong education program and evening concert at UNESCO Headquarters in Paris, France. Educational activities included public panel discussions and lectures throughout the World Heritage Centre. The evening concert featured more than two dozen musicians and included remarks by Hancock, UNESCO Director-General Irina Bokova, United States Permanent Representative to UNESCO David Killion, and TSF Jazz Program Director Sebastien Vidal.

The second part took place at sunrise on the following Monday, April 30, in Congo Square in New Orleans. Hosted by actor Harry Shearer with remarks by New Orleans Mayor Mitch Landrieu and UNESCO Director-General Irina Bokova, the event consisted of performances by Herbie Hancock, trumpeter Kermit Ruffins, the Treme Brass Band, vocalist Stephanie Jordan, pianist Ellis Marsalis, drummer Jeff "Tain" Watts, and trumpeter Terence Blanchard.

Notable among the performances was a rendition of Herbie Hancock's composition "Watermelon Man", which Hancock led with students from the Thelonious Monk Institute's Performing Arts High School program. Event producers organized simultaneous performances by student groups in Paris, Rio de Janeiro, and Cape Town, which were streamed live and broadcast by CNN and CBS This Morning.

The sunrise event occurred on the opening weekend of the New Orleans Jazz & Heritage Festival, which led some observers—including Mayor Landrieu and host Harry Shearer—to remark that numerous attendees had simply not gone to bed the night before.

The concluding event—a "sunset" concert to contrast with the New Orleans festivities earlier in the day—took place at the United Nations General Assembly Hall in New York City and included performances by Hancock, Tony Bennett, Dee Dee Bridgewater, Candido, and Stevie Wonder. Hosts included Robert De Niro, Michael Douglas, Morgan Freeman and Quincy Jones. Pianist George Duke served as musical director. The program was noted for including musicians from every continent except Antarctica.

=== Istanbul ===
Istanbul, Turkey, served as the Global Host City for International Jazz Day 2013. On Tuesday, April 30, UNESCO, the Monk Institute and IKSV coordinated more than a dozen free education events at the Beyoğlu Municipal Youth Center, the Borusan Music House, and the SALT contemporary art space, as well as a number of fringe events at Istanbul jazz clubs and music venues. Daytime activities allowed for contact between visiting musicians and local Turkish students and musicians. Other participants included Robert Glasper, T. S. Monk, Marcus Miller, Hugh Masekela, Anat Cohen, Keiko Matsui, and Erik Truffaz, with highlighted Turkish musicians including Okay Temiz, Aydin Esen, Ozan Musluoğlu, and Burak Bedikyan.

A number of the 2013 education activities were concentrated in the cosmopolitan district of Beyoğlu in venues including the Akbank Sanat arts center, the Alt jazz club, and Galatasaray High School, where saxophonist Wayne Shorter gave a master class for students and accepted UNESCO's Cultural Diversity Medal from Director-General Bokova.

The 4th-century Byzantine church Hagia Irene hosted the evening All-Star Global Concert. Participants included Joss Stone, Rubén Blades, Terence Blanchard, George Duke, Al Jarreau, Branford Marsalis, John McLaughlin, Dianne Reeves, Lee Ritenour and Hüsnü şenlendirici. Pianist John Beasley served as musical director. The concert was one of George Duke's last public appearances before his death three months later. The evening's hosts included UNESCO Director-General Bokova, Herbie Hancock, Turkish comedian Cem Yılmaz, and community activist Martin Luther King III, who delivered remarks commemorating the 50th anniversary of the March on Washington. The concert was streamed live on YouTube.

In parallel with the festivities in Istanbul, more than 100 countries registered events commemorating the second edition of International Jazz Day. Partners included regional and municipal governments, private citizens, jazz clubs, cultural centers and community organizations. Worldwide celebrations encompassed jam sessions, concerts, public performances, film screenings, showings of the All-Star Global Concert, and educational workshops and master classes.

Among the parallel events organized in 2013 was a 12-hour program of free performances, master classes, and discussions on the Rue des Lombards in Paris. The program was spread among the jazz clubs Duc des Lombards, Baiser Salé, Sunset and Sunside. Participants included Ray Lema, Manu Dibango, Gregory Porter, Kelly Lee Evans, Leila Martial, Tony Tixier, Etienne Mbappé, Rémi Panossian, and Lou Tavano. French broadcaster Radio TSF Jazz covered the program.

=== Osaka ===
International Jazz Day 2014 was hosted by the city of Osaka, Japan. The principal local organizer was the Osaka Government Tourism Bureau.

The 2014 education program was staged inside the Osaka School of Music. The free program opened with a performance of King Oliver's West End Blues by Japanese duo Yoshio and Keiko Toyama. Modules included panel discussions, master classes, and film screenings, and included artists from the evening's All-Star Global Concert, including Herbie Hancock, Toshiko Akiyoshi, Dee Dee Bridgewater, Roberta Gambarini, Chris Thomas King, Earl Klugh, Marcus Miller, Thelonious Monk Jr., and Esperanza Spalding. Notable programming included a dance workshop with students from the Osaka school by choreographer Hinton Battle, a brass clinic for students and local musicians by trumpeter Terumasa Hino, and a dialogue with saxophonist Wayne Shorter titled Philosophy of Life Through Jazz.

The Global Concert took place on the grounds of Osaka Castle in Nishinomaru Garden for around 10,000 people. The lineup featured 34 musicians from the United States, Japan, Australia, Brazil, Italy, Mali, South Africa, and the United Kingdom. Performers included trombonist Steve Turre on conch shells with master taiko drummer Shuichi Hidano; Herbie Hancock and Wayne Shorter with a rendition of Michiel Borstlap's Memory of Enchantment and Chris Thomas King, John Scofield, and Joe Louis Walker on Robert Johnson's "Ramblin' on My Mind". As part of the 2014 concert, astronauts Richard Mastracchio and Koichi Wakata delivered a video greeting from the International Space Station.

The 2014 Global Concert inaugurated the tradition of performing the arrangement of the John Lennon song "Imagine" from Hancock's 2010 album The Imagine Project as the show finale.

In 2014, International Jazz Day events took place in all 195 UNESCO member states, including Mongolia, where the U.S. Embassy hosted a jazz concert in its American Corner, Uruguay, where the Jazz a la Calle youth development program sponsored performances by local groups, and Ghana, where a local Alliance Française organized concerts and education programs as part of the Live in Accra Jazz Festival.

Also in 2014, the United Nations Postal Administration issued a series of postage stamps and a souvenir card to commemorate International Jazz Day. The stamps were designed by artist Sergio Baradat.

=== Paris ===
Paris, France, served as the Global Host City for International Jazz Day 2015. The local celebration was co-coordinated by the City of Paris, with municipal and private partners including the governments of multiple arrondissements, SNCF, TSF Jazz and the Paris Jazz Club.

In contrast to the previous edition, the 2015 education program took place in venues across 14 of the 20 Paris arrondissements. Daniel Humair, Gregory Privat, Sonny Troupé, Olivier Bogé, Lisa Cat-Berro, and Tricia Evy, with Herbie Hancock, Al Jarreau, Marcus Miller and steel pannist Sean Thomas. There were master classes, discussions, and performances at clubs, conservatories, and cultural centers. Vocalist Dee Dee Bridgewater and guitarist Sylvain Luc performed for children at a local homeless shelter, while multiple artists—including pianist and songwriter André Manoukian and Bridgewater's daughter, vocalist China Moses, gave surprise showcases for passersby at the five main terminus stations for the French national railway. Saxophonist Wayne Shorter tested instruments for students at the Conservatoire à Rayonnement Régional de Paris. The River's King, a 450 m^{2}river barge, served as a "jazz boat" that traversed the Seine while musicians performed for audiences on board. Many of the city's jazz clubs, including those on the Rue des Lombards, offered free admission on April 30 in recognition of the Day.

UNESCO Headquarters hosted the 2015 Global Concert. Participating musicians represented 13 countries. John Beasley was musical director with performances by Mino Cinelu, Avishai Cohen, Kellylee Evans, Hugh Masekela, Marcus Miller, Guillaume Perret, and Lee Ritenour on Mandela's anti-apartheid protest song "Bring Him Back Home (Nelson Mandela)"; Femi Kuti with an ensemble rendition of his Afrobeat hit "No Place for My Dream"; and Igor Butman, James Genus, Avishai Cohen and Herbie Hancock on the latter's composition "The Sorcerer". After the concert, the Louis Vuitton Foundation hosted a reception which included a solo performance by Hancock.

The independently organized global events in 2015 included programs on all seven continents. In Antarctica, research staff at Palmer Station formed a four-piece band and recorded a performance of Mike Shapiro's "Spooky". In The Bahamas, the Bahamas National Commission for UNESCO coordinated a daylong concert series in downtown Nassau and conducted outreach to local schools. In Latvia, organizer Wise Music Society produced more than 30 jazz events in seven cities across the country, as well as the Latvian Embassy in London. More than 50 cities throughout Italy participated by holding their own events on or around April 30, including a performance by guitarist John Scofield at the Museo del Violino in Cremona and a concert featuring drummer Antonio Sanchez at Fano's Teatro della Fortuna.

=== Washington, D.C. ===
The 2016 International Jazz Day host celebration took place in Washington, D.C. Daytime programs on April 30 spanning the eight wards were largely free and open to the public, including performances, film screenings, jam sessions, discussions, and workshops with local and visiting musicians. The Day opened with a ceremony in Washington's DuPont Circle with remarks from UNESCO Director-General Bokova, Herbie Hancock, and International Rescue Committee Chairman David Miliband, followed by performances by Hancock and Dee Dee Bridgewater. Other highlights included a panel on "Jazz, Human Rights, & Cultural Diplomacy" at the National Museum of American History with Hancock, Director-General Bokova, French Minister of Justice Christiane Taubira, and Hugh Masekela; a performance by Dianne Reeves and Cyrus Chestnut at local homeless services center Thrive DC; and a discussion on women in jazz with Reeves, Bridgewater, and Terri Lyne Carrington at the National Museum of Women in the Arts. The 2016 program also included a walking tour of the history of jazz in Washington, DC; a 900-foot canvas paint jam; activities for patients at Howard University Hospital, a senior center, food distribution centers and food truck stops; pop-up performances throughout the city, including in metro stations; and a children's jazz show at the Petworth Recreation Center. First Lady Michelle Obama hosted a workshop and performance for public school students in the State Dining Room of the White House.

The 2016 All-Star Concert took place on a stage erected on the South Lawn of the White House with musical direction by John Beasley. Hosted by President Barack Obama and First Lady Michelle Obama, the concert included more than three-dozen musicians representing twelve nationalities. Notable among the performances was a medley paying tribute to singer-songwriter Prince, who had died the previous week, featuring vocalist Aretha Franklin, Herbie Hancock, Terri Lyne Carrington, guitarist Lionel Loueke, pianist Robert Glasper, bassist Ben Williams, and rapper Rapsody. Making their first appearance at an International Jazz Day event were pianists Joey Alexander, Chick Corea, Jamie Cullum, Diana Krall, and Chucho Valdés, drummers Brian Blade and Kendrick Scott, saxophonists Paquito D'Rivera, David Sánchez, and Bobby Watson, guitarists Buddy Guy and Pat Metheny, trumpeter James Morrison, Trombone Shorty, and Sting. Morgan Freeman served as host.

The evening concert was filmed live on April 29, and subsequently broadcast the following evening on ABC. The live footage was interspersed with recorded performances by cast members from spaces in the White House, including the Grand Foyer, the Blue Room, and the State Dining Room.

In the lead-up to International Jazz Day 2016, on April 26 U.S. Secretary of Education John King presided over the unveiling of Math, Science and Music, an online STEAM learning platform, at the Department of Education headquarters in Washington, D.C. In attendance were Hancock and cognitive scientist Jeanne Bamberger and pianist Vijay Iyer, both of whom consulted on the project.

More than a thousand parallel events were organized around the world for Jazz Day 2016. In Port-au-Prince, Haiti, the Norwegian educational nonprofit Prosjekt Haiti organized a performance and education program for 300 of its students. In South Korea, music venues like Jazzda, the Royal Anchor, and Old Blue participated in a "Korea Jazz Club Day". In Benghazi, Libya, the International School Benghazi assigned students to research jazz music and make a presentation to their classmates. For the third consecutive year, the United States Antarctic Program participated by organizing a staff performance at the South Pole Station.

=== Havana ===
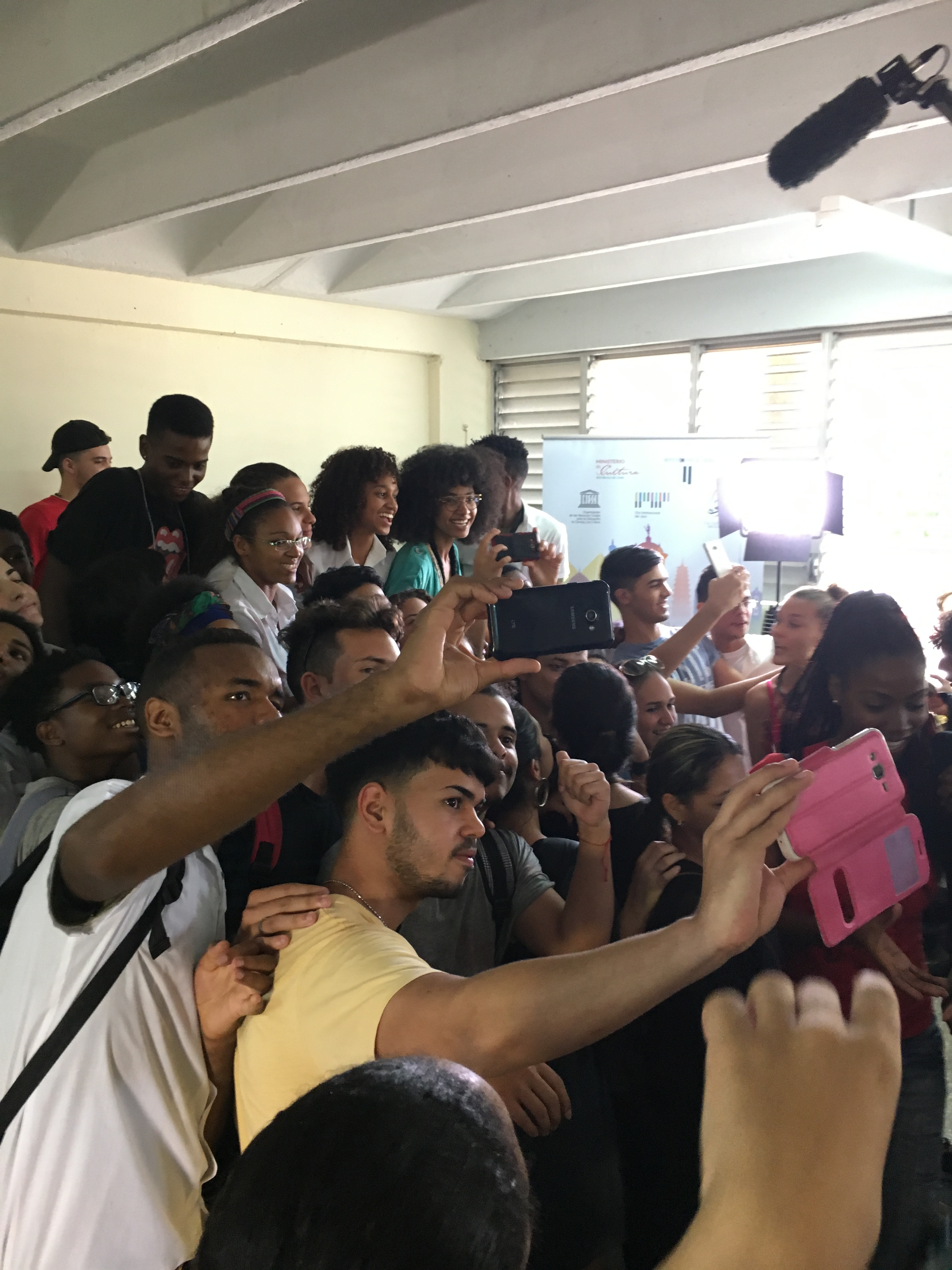
Bassist Esperanza Spalding with students at the Instituto Superior de Arte in Havana, Cuba during International Jazz Day 2017 celebrations.

The 2017 Global Host celebration was held in Havana, Cuba. The program took place over a week from April 24 – 30. The 2017 celebration spanned venues including the Pabellón Cuba in Vedado, the Instituto Superior de Arte on the grounds of the former Habanero Country Club, the Fábrica de Arte Cubano, and the municipal amphitheater in the eastern township of Guanabacoa. Conservatories throughout the city were included, as were jazz clubs such as the Jazz Café, La Zorra y el Cuervo, and El Tablao. The educational and service component included Esperanza Spalding, Marcus Miller, Antonio Hart, and Regina Carter. There was a panel discussion on jazz and cinema at the Hotel Nacional de Cuba, which included UNESCO Director-General Irina Bokova, Herbie Hancock, Quincy Jones, and Chucho Valdés.

The 2017 program included several instances of interaction between Cuban musicians and students and the visiting musicians. Cameroonian bassist Richard Bona performed with his group Mandekan Cubano for students and parents at the Guanabacoa Amphitheater. Saxophonist Melissa Aldana, pianist Tarek Yamani, and trumpeter Takuya Kuroda conducted master classes for students at the Superior and National Schools of Art. Graduate fellows of the Thelonious Monk Institute of Jazz Performance, a master's program at the UCLA Herb Alpert School of Music, participated in workshops and jam sessions with musicians at Havana conservatories.

Performers included pianist Alejandro Falcón, trombonist Eduardo Sandoval, saxophonist Michel Herrera, drummer Yissy Garcia, flautist Orlando "Maraca" Valle, drummer Oliver Valdés, and violinist William Roblejo. A concert featuring more than a dozen Cuban musicians took place on April 28 at Cuba's National Theater hosted by Cuban percussionist Ruy López-Nussa.

The 2017 All-Star Global Concert took place at the Gran Teatro de La Habana Alicia Alonso and featured 55 musicians representing fifteen nationalities. Actor Will Smith served as host along with Quincy Jones, Herbie Hancock, and Esperanza Spalding. Ivan Lins performed "Lua Soberana" with Marcus Miller, trumpeter Till Brönner, pianist A Bu, and an all-Cuban rhythm section; Spalding, Korean vocalist Youn Sun Nah, and Regina Carter performed "Bésame Mucho"; and pianists Chucho Valdés and Gonzalo Rubalcaba delivering a duet version of "Blue Monk". The 2017 concert was broadcast simultaneously outside the Gran Teatro for free public viewing.

Numerous independent musicians, organizations and local governments organized International Jazz Day observances in 2017. The number of events again topped 1,000. Activities included a benefit concert in Ebersburg, Germany to raise awareness of a German-Mongolian student exchange, a street festival in Iwakuni City, Japan, and a free education program and concert for students in the rural outskirts of Antananarivo, Madagascar.

=== Saint Petersburg ===
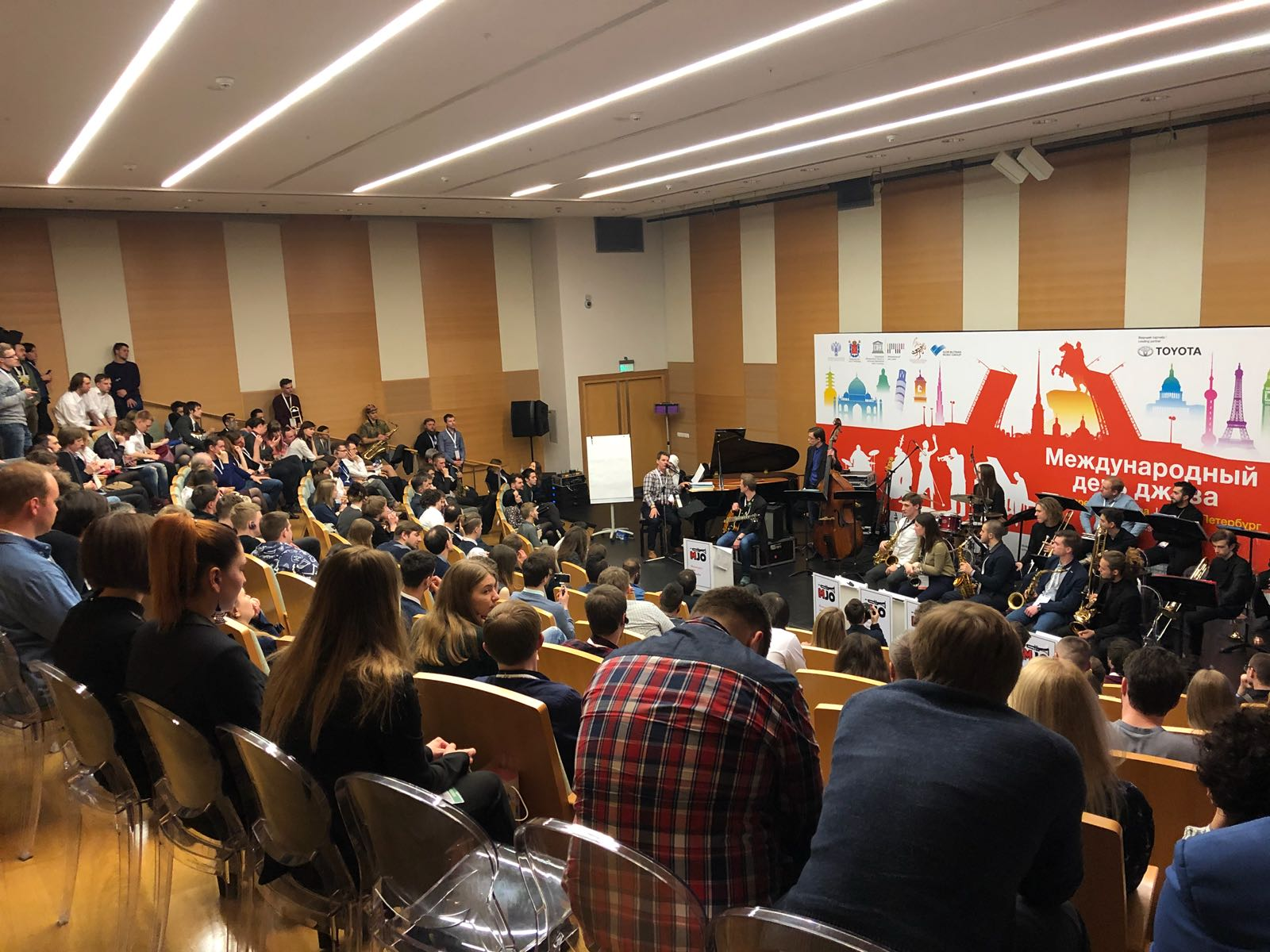
Student musicians and attendees participate in a big band workshop at the Mariinsky Theatre in Saint Petersburg, Russia, part of the International Jazz Day 2018 Global Host Celebration.

In October 2017, UNESCO announced the selection of St. Petersburg, Russia and Sydney, Australia as International Jazz Day Global Host Cities for 2018 and 2019, respectively. The 2018 celebration took place in St. Petersburg from April 28–30 and included education and performance programs at the Saint Petersburg State Jazz Philharmonic Hall and the Mariinsky Theatre. Russian saxophonist and bandleader Igor Butman served as Artistic Co-director along with UNESCO Goodwill Ambassador Herbie Hancock. The culminating All-Star Global Concert included performances by Till Brönner, Terri Lyne Carrington, Gilad Hekselman, Robert Glasper, Rudresh Mahanthappa, Danilo Pérez, Dianne Reeves and Lee Ritenour, among others.

=== Sydney and Melbourne ===
2019 host celebrations took place in Australia, with an extensive program of educational activities taking place in the lead-up to April 30. Programs were split between the Sydney Opera House and the Melbourne Conservatorium of Music. The Sydney program included master classes by Herbie Hancock, James Morrison, Antonio Hart, Michael Mayo, faculty from the Sydney Conservatorium of Music and students from the Herbie Hancock Institute of Jazz Performance. In Melbourne, artists including Eli Degibri, A Bu, Tarek Yamani, William Barton and Eric Reed offered workshops. Other education and performance programs took place in Brisbane, Adelaide and Perth.

The festivities in Australia culminated in the 2019 All-Star Global Concert at Melbourne's Hamer Hall. Artists from 13 countries participated, including Herbie Hancock, James Morrison, William Barton, Brian Blade, Igor Butman, Theo Croker, Joey DeFrancesco, Eli Degibri, Kurt Elling, James Genus, Aditya Kalyanpur, Ledisi, Jane Monheit, Chico Pinheiro, Tineke Postma, Eric Reed, Antonio Sánchez, Somi, Ben Williams, Lizz Wright and Tarek Yamani.

International Jazz Day 2019 included celebrations in 195 countries on every continent.

=== Cape Town and virtual celebrations in 2020 ===
In November 2018, Cape Town, South Africa was announced as the 2020 Global Host City, "marking the first time the celebration is hosted by an African city." The festivities were officially cancelled in March 2020 due to the COVID-19 pandemic, along with programs planned in cities across South Africa.

In lieu of an on-site celebration, the 2020 edition of International Jazz Day took place virtually, with virtual master classes featuring Danilo Pérez, Igor Butman, Dee Dee Bridgewater, Oran Etkin and others offered for free on Facebook. The program also included a panel discussion with Marcus Miller and South African vocalist Sibongile Khumalo hosted by jazz journalist Nate Chinen. The 2020 Global Concert consisted of pre-recorded performances and greetings submitted by artists around the world, including Miller, Khumalo, Bridgewater, Lang Lang, John McLaughlin, John Scofield, Cécile McLorin Salvant, A Bu and Youn Sun Nah, as well as clips from previous Jazz Day concerts. Herbie Hancock offered a tribute to jazz artists who lost their lives due to COVID-19. In parallel, as part of the worldwide commemorations, International Jazz Day organizers invited musicians from around the world to create their own at-home performances, livestreamed concerts, and other tributes in honor of the 2020 edition. Musicians including Gonzalo Rubalcaba, Anat Cohen, Louiz Banks, Chucho Valdés and many others contributed submissions.

=== Celebrations in 2021 ===
Jazz Day's 10th anniversary celebration took place largely online due to continued concerns about COVID-19. A series of workshops and panels were streamed throughout the day on April 30 in the lead-up to the All-Star Concert, including master classes with Lionel Loueke, Antonio Sánchez, Billy Childs and Linda Oh. Herbie Hancock participated in panel discussions with UNESCO Director General Audrey Azoulay and film composer Kris Bowers.

The 2021 All-Star Global Concert was pre-taped and streamed online, with contributions from artists in cities around the world, including New York, Los Angeles, Rio de Janeiro, Moscow, Cape Town and Paris. Participating musicians represented 17 nationalities and included Melissa Aldana, John Beasley, Dee Dee Bridgewater, A Bu, Igor Butman, Cyrus Chestnut, Jacob Collier, Andra Day, Mandisi Dyantyis, Amina Figarova, Roberta Gambarini, Kenny Garrett, Herbie Hancock, Angélique Kidjo, Ivan Lins, Joe Lovano, Rudresh Mahanthappa, Dianne Reeves and Veronica Swift, among others. The concert was hosted by American actor Michael Douglas and included remarks honoring the 10th anniversary celebration by UNESCO Director General Azoulay along with United Nations Secretary General António Guterres.

Following the All-Star Global Concert, PBS in the United States broadcast a special two-hour retrospective titled "International Jazz Day 10th Anniversary Celebration." The program showcased highlights from the previous decade of Jazz Day festivities, including performances by Herbie Hancock, Wayne Shorter, Stevie Wonder, Aretha Franklin, Tony Bennett, Chaka Khan, Annie Lennox and Sting.

=== Celebrations in 2022 ===
Marking 10 years since the inaugural concert in 2012, in 2022 International Jazz Day celebrations centered around United Nations Headquarters in New York and were themed around peace and unity in recognition of the Russian invasion of Ukraine, the COVID-19 pandemic and other global crises. Artists including Ravi Coltrane, José James, Gregory Porter, Hiromi Uehara, David Sanborn, Erena Terakubo and Youn Sun Nah gave performances from the General Assembly Hall. The Global Concert was hosted by Herbie Hancock and streamed live. In a memorable moment, Hancock performed his original composition "Maiden Voyage" alongside Coltrane, James Genus, Zakir Hussain, Brian Blade and Randy Brecker. The U.S. Ambassador to the United Nations, Linda Thomas-Greenfield, delivered remarks at the UN as part of the program, recalling of famed American jazz ambassadors Louis Armstrong, Billie Holiday and Duke Ellington: "In the mid-twentieth century, they were part of a State Department program to share jazz with the world. In Eastern Europe, in the Middle East, in Asia. A form of 'cultural diplomacy' amid the Cold War. In their performances, they shared the creativity, the diversity, and the freedom of jazz."

2022 saw independent celebrations in more than 180 countries worldwide, including extensive programs in Chile, Slovenia, Armenia, Ghana, Mexico, the United States and Italy.
