= Fight to Win =

Fight to Win may refer to:

- Fight to Win (album), a 2001 album by Femi Kuti
- Fight to Win (film), a 1987 action film
