= Femi Kuti (album) =

Studio album by Femi Kuti
- Released: 13 June 1995
- Recorded: 1994
- Genre: Afrobeat
- Length: 73:56
- Label: Tabu
- Producer: Andy Lyden & Femi Anikulapo Kuti

Femi Kuti chronology
M.Y.O.B. (1991)	Femi Kuti (1995)	Shoki Shoki (1998)

Professional ratings
Review scores
Source	Rating
Allmusic	4.5/5 stars

Femi Kuti is the third album by Nigerian musician Femi Kuti released on 13 June 1995. It was released on Motown's Tabu Records label. The album introduced Femi Kuti and afrobeat to an international audience.

== Legacy ==
The album was included in the book 1001 Albums You Must Hear Before You Die.

== Track listing ==
All songs written by Femi Kuti. All song produced by Andy Lyden and Femi Anikulapo Kuti.

1. "Wonder, Wonder" – 6:06
2. "Survival" – 8:55
3. "Frustrations" – 9:06
4. "Nawa (Intro)" – 0:30
5. "Nawa" – 8:39
6. "Plenty Nonsense" – 9:31
7. "Stubborn Problems" – 9:32
8. "No Shame" – 6:28
9. "Live for Today" – 8:56
10. "Changes" – 5:59

== See also ==
- Fela Kuti
