= ODU =

ODU may stand for:

- Civic Democratic Union, a former party in Slovakia
- Odigo User File, a file extension used in Odigo Messenger
- Ohio Dominican University in Columbus, Ohio, United States
- Old Dominion University in Norfolk, Virginia, United States
- Operational Dress Uniform, a work uniform of the United States Coast Guard
- Optical channel Data Unit, the digital path layer for the Optical Transport Network (OTN)
- Out-Door Unit, a unit used in microwave transmission

== See also ==
- Odu (disambiguation)
- Odus (disambiguation)
