= Odus =

Odus may refer to:

- Odus (fly), a genus of flies
- Odus Creamer Horney (1866–1957), U.S. Army brigadier general
- Odus Mitchell (1899–1989), American football player and coach
- Odus, a fictional owl in Candy Crush Saga
- Odus, the 256 chapters of the Ifá Literary Corpus.

== See also ==
- ODU (disambiguation)
- Odu (disambiguation)
