= The Return of the Juju King =

Compilation album by King Sunny Adé
- Released: 1987
- Genre: Jùjú
- Label: Mercury

King Sunny Adé chronology
Aura (1984)	The Return of the Juju King (1987)	Live Live Juju (1988)

The Return of the Juju King is a compilation album by the Nigerian musician King Sunny Adé, released in 1987. It was his first album after being dropped by Island Records. Adé supported the album with a North American tour that featured a 15-member version of his band, the African Beats.

== Production ==
The compilation collects tracks from several of Adé's Nigerian albums, which were released on his Atom Park label; Adé had formed a new version of his band to record them. Most of the 17 tracks run together, producing five sections. Adé emphasized the sound of a ukulele on many tracks.

== Critical reception ==
Professional ratings
Review scores
Source	Rating
AllMusic	3/5 stars
Chicago Sun-Times	3.5/4 stars
Robert Christgau	B+
Los Angeles Times	3/4 stars
The Rolling Stone Album Guide	4/5 stars
Spin Alternative Record Guide	5/10

The Chicago Tribune wrote that the album "serves to highlight Ade's patented 'Synchro System' style, emphasizing a balance between all the 20-odd instruments in his band—the burbling, clattering, thumping riot of talking drums, shakers, rattles and other percussion, the sinuous electric and Hawaiian guitar lines and the synthesizer fills." The Los Angeles Times deemed the music "characteristically hypnotic, joyful and eminently danceable." Robert Christgau panned "the weakness of digital remixers for percussion." Trouser Press concluded: "Shaking off his failure to win Western hearts, Adé sounds like a happy man again; the joyous juju reaffirms his status as one of the most captivating and important musical talents anywhere in the world today."

AllMusic stated that "the sound is from the 'synchro system' end of the spectrum, with slightly psychedelic guitar effects here and there and loping beats bumped out by a collection of talking drums as well as the usual drum kit."

== Track listing ==
No.	Title	Length
1.	"Sunny Loni Ariya"
2.	"Sweet Banana"
3.	"Olomoge Ma Jo"
4.	"Mo Ti Kole Mi Sori Apata"
5.	"Ona Mi La"
6.	"My Dear"
7.	"E Gbe Kini Yi Laruge"
8.	"Odu Oteyi Yato"
9.	"Emi Nfe"
10.	"Ori O Bami Se Temi"
11.	"A Mbo O"
12.	"Oluwa Lo Yan Mi Wa"
13.	"Let Them Say"
14.	"Mo Ti Gb'Ohun Oluwa"
15.	"Gbass Kelele"
16.	"Ma Jo Bi Olokun"
17.	"E Ba Mi Dupe F'Oluwa"
