= Juju Music =

Studio album by King Sunny Adé and His African Beats
- Released: 1982
- Recorded: 1982
- Genres: Jùjú, worldbeat
- Length: 43:05
- Label: Mango
- Producer: Martin Meissonnier

King Sunny Adé and His African Beats chronology
Juju Music (1982)	Synchro System (1983)

Juju Music is the 1982 major label debut of Nigerian jùjú band King Sunny Adé and His African Beats. It was produced by keyboard player Martin Meissonnier, who introduced synthesizers and Linn drums into Adé's established juju sound. It represented the first worldwide release for Adé, who was already established in his native Nigeria as its "biggest musical draw and juju music's reigning monarch". The album was a critical and commercial success, peaking at No. 111 on Billboard's "Pop Albums" chart.

The New York Times, which described the album in 1982 as "the year's freshest dance-music album", later credited it in 1990 with having launched the "World Beat movement in the United States". In its review, Allmusic indicates that the album gave Adé "unprecedented exposure on the Western market and introduced a slew of music lovers to the sounds of Afro-pop."

== Background ==
In the early 1980s, when Island Records approached Adé about releasing his material internationally under its Mango Records imprint, the musician was already a star in his native Nigeria, with his own record label, his own nightclub to host his performances and a track record of releasing three or four albums a year. When Adé agreed, he was teamed with Martin Meissonnier, a French record producer who advised that the typical long song structures of Nigerian music would not work for Western audiences. Accordingly, Adé divided a number of his Nigerian hits for international release, a task he found unchallenging. He later explained that "In Nigeria, we got used to non-stop recording, about 18 to 20 minutes of music. But over here, the music should be track-by-track for the radio and the dance floor. It's like making a dress. One by one, the different pieces are joined together, but you can still see the lines where they meet".

The album Juju Music was coupled with an international tour, with Island Records ambitiously hoping to position Adé as a new Bob Marley. The tour setlist drew little from the album it was meant to support; at a three-hour show in New York City, the band played only two songs from Juju Music, "Ja Funmi" and "Eje Nlo Gba Ara Mi". Island's marketing of Adé was later described by Tucson Weekly as "a monumental juncture in the exposure and development of world beat music; perhaps the first time a major American imprint had fully endorsed an African-derived music that was not reggae".

== Musical style ==
Although Meissonnier altered the song structure, he did not alter Adé's style. To Westerners, Adé's music seemed eclectic, with reviewers of Juju Music commenting variously on the mingling of "the spacey mixing techniques of Jamaican dub" into Adé's "Nigerian polyrhythms", and—even more minutely—on the "echoes of old reggae in its lean guitar riffs, salsa in its Yoruban drum patterns, country in the steel-guitar playing, dub in the music's wide-open holes, folk and calypso in its gentle singing and the Grateful Dead and jazz in its long jams". At the time of the album's release, New York Times reviewer Robert Palmer speculated that Adé's Yoruban heritage might lead listeners in America to a sense of familiarity with Adé's music, as the Yoruban culture has far-flung influences in other cultures and musical types. Rather than catalog those represented types, Palmer described Adé's style as a "fusion of traditional Yoruba drumming with a pop instrumentation that includes pedal steel guitar and synthesizer".

Palmer notes the songs, many of which are "drawn from traditional proverbs", "espouse traditional values". In a 2005 interview, Adé confirmed that in his musical career "all the songs are more or less a proverb". The artist offered as an example of this an explication of the popular anthem "Ja Funmi" from Juju Music, an "instant classic" according to Afropop Worldwide which he plays at every show in spite of the vast body of work from which he might choose. Adé indicated that "Ja Funmi" is a common phrase meaning "Fight for me", adding:

Now when I say “Ja, Ja Funmi,”—“Fight, fight for me.” Then I will now say my head should fight for me. That means my head should protect me. Because I use my head instead of calling my God. This is my god. God created my brain to control myself. So this is representative of my God. So you should protect me, you should fight for me. Because the vulture was helped by his head. The birds are being helped by their heads. Even the snakes are being like that. So I want it to fight for me as well. It’s like a proverb.... You have to compare what you’re saying with another thing.

He concluded with an explicit explanation of the metaphor, saying, "You use your head to represent your God".

In spite of the title of that song, Adé's tone is not aggressive, marking what Palmer highlights as an essential difference between most music from underdeveloped nations and that on Adé's album—listeners of the time expected such music to be "angry and militant", but Adé is rather "sweet and cool", a traditional element of Yoruban art. In his review, Palmer describes the beginning of the song "Mo Beru Agba" in detail, concluding that the music shifts "textures as mercurially as an African breeze, but with three talking drums and a section of congas, bongos, and other percussion instruments continuing to lay down a densely woven fabric of propulsive rhythms". The overall impression to Rolling Stone reviewer Chip Stern was of "some hazy, distant dream of communal ritual and peace".

== Reception ==
Professional ratings
Review scores
Source	Rating
AllMusic	4.5/5 stars
Christgau's Record Guide	A−
Pitchfork	10/10
Rolling Stone	4/5 stars

According to Rolling Stone, both the album and the debut tours received "universal rave reviews". In its own review, the magazine recommended that "Fans of the New Romantics' soul train...disembark and check it out—the view is breathtaking". The New York Times praised the album as "lilting, lyrical, compulsively danceable", "spectacularly up-to-date" and "difficult to resist". It was ranked among the top ten "Albums of the Year" for 1982 by NME. Combined, the album and tour have been credited with not only internationally popularizing World Beat, but also with opening international doors for other performers of Afropop.

== Track listing ==
All tracks composed by King Sunny Adé.

1. "Ja Funmi" – 7:08
2. "Eje Nlo Gba Ara Mi" – 7:14
3. "Mo Beru Agba" – 3:27
4. "Sunny Ti de Ariya" – 3:46
5. "Ma Jaiye Oni" – 5:07
6. "365 Is My Number/The Message" – 8:16
7. "Samba/E Falaba Lewe" – 8:07

== Personnel ==
- Shina Abiodun – conga
- Mofes Acambi – drums
- King Sunny Adé – guitar, composer, keyboards, vocals, mixing
- Ademola Adepoju – steel guitar
- Adisa Adeyemi – bongos
- Jacob Ajakaye – vocals
- Rasaki Aladokun – African drum, talking drum
- Gani Alashe – shekere
- Michael Babalola – maracas
- Adrian Boot – photography
- Tunde Demiola – vocals
- Niyi Falaye – vocals
- Jomoh Gbadamosi – African drum, talking drum
- Jelili Lawal – bass guitar
- Segun Llori – guitar
- Godwin Logie – mixing
- Martin Meissonnier – keyboards, producer
- Bob Ohiri – guitar
- John Okeumeu – guitar, rhythm guitar
- Alhaji Timmy Olaitan – drums, African drums
- Matthew Olojede – vocals
- Femi Owomoyela – vocals
- Segun Shokumbi – vocals
- Bruno Tilley – design
