= Synchro System =

Studio album by King Sunny Adé and His African Beats
- Released: 1983
- Genres: Jùjú, African pop
- Length: 38:56
- Labels: Mango, Island
- Producer: Martin Meissonnier

King Sunny Adé and His African Beats chronology
| Juju Music (1982) | Synchro System (1983) | Aura (1984) |

Synchro System
- Alternate cover

Synchro System is a 1983 album by Nigerian jùjú band King Sunny Adé and His African Beats. It was the second of King Sunny Adé's three releases for Island Records, following on the heels of 1982's crossover success Juju Music. The title track is a re-recording of Adé's 1974 Nigerian hit of the same name.

The album peaked at No. 91 on Billboard's "Pop Albums" chart. It garnered Adé a Grammy Award nomination, a first for a Nigerian artist. It was re-released in 1990.

== Recording ==
The album was Adé's first to be recorded in London. It was produced by Martin Meissonnier, who worked to taper Adé's sound to Western listeners by clearly distinguishing each element in the mix, including guitar riffs, "simmering" percussion, and vocals, which were then "thickened" with keyboard additions. The album features fewer steel guitar contributions from Ademola Adepoju than its predecessor, but like Adé's other early 1980s recordings, it employs synthesizers and drum machines. The album features more synthesizer lines and more distinctive "songs" with shorter track lengths than Juju Music (1982).

== Critical reception ==
Professional ratings
Review scores
| Source | Rating |
|---|---|
| All Music Guide | 5/5 stars |
| Christgau's Record Guide | A− |
| Rolling Stone | 3/5 stars |
| The Rolling Stone Album Guide | 4/5 stars |

Syncro System charted higher than the crossover success Juju Music. Critic Robert Christgau credited Meissonnier with improving Adé's production for Western reception by “emphasizing discrete melodies and heating up the mix," calling the album "more conventionally unified" than its predecessor. Jonathan Gregg of Rolling Stone opined that while this album held many of the same features as the former, it "does not quite match the excitement or subtlety" and did demonstrate limitations within the emerging genre.

In their 1990 book African Rock, authors Chris Stapleton and Chris May call the album "the most satisfying of Ade's albums for Island, carefully balancing Western and Nigerian elements," and called it "the first juju album to generate easy dancing on British floors." In 2007, The Mojo Collection refers to the album as "an abstract, a frozen picture of what the African Beats were like" which "still sounds intensely vivid."

The album was ranked at number 10 among the "Albums of the Year" for 1983 by NME.

== Track listing ==
All tracks composed by King Sunny Adé.

1. "Synchro Feelings – Ilako" – 5:36
2. "Mo Ti Mo" – 5:31
3. "Penkele" – 4:00
4. "Maajo" – 4:10
5. "Synchro System" – 6:27
6. "E Saiye Re" – 3:29
7. "Tolongo" – 3:19
8. "E Wele" – 5:03
9. "Synchro (Reprise)" – 1:27

== Personnel ==
Performance

- Fatoke Abiodun – percussion, agogô
- Shina Abiodun – conga
- King Sunny Adé – guitar, keyboards, vocals
- Ademola Adepoju – steel guitar
- Jacob Ajakaye – vocals
- Moses Akanbi – drums
- John Akpan – guitar, rhythm guitar
- Rasaki Aladokun – African drum, talking drum
- Gani Alashe – percussion, shekere
- Michael Babalola – maracas
- Elder Osei Bonsu – guitar, percussion, motimo
- Jonah Bonsu – keyboards
- Tunde Demiola – vocals
- Niyi Falaye – vocals
- Segun Hori – guitar
- Jelili Lawal – bass
- Martin Meissonnier – keyboards
- Bob Ohiri – guitar
- Alhaji Timmy Olaitan – drums, African drum, talking drum
- Matthew Olojede – vocals
- Femi Owomoyela – vocals

Production

- Lynn Goldsmith – photography, cover photo
- Godwin Logie – engineer, mixing
- Martin Meissonnier – producer, coordination
- Stephen Street – assistant engineer, mixing
