= Africa for Africa =

Studio album by Femi Kuti
- Released: 2010 / 2011
- Genre: Afrobeat
- Label: Wrasse / Knitting Factory
- Producer: Sodi

Femi Kuti chronology
Day by Day (2008)	Africa for Africa (2010)	No Place for My Dream (2013)

Africa for Africa is an album by Nigerian musician Femi Kuti, released in 2010 on Wrasse Records. The album was also released in 2011 on Knitting Factory Records.

== Critical reception ==
AllMusic's Jeff Tamarkin said the album continued Femi's father, Fela, tradition but sounded more modern and incorporated wider influences including Latin, Caribbean, and African-American. He also said it had a strong political message.

== Track listing ==
1. Dem Bobo
2. Nobody Beg You
3. Politics in Africa
4. Bad Government
5. Can't Buy Me
6. Africa for Africa
7. Make We Remember
8. Obasanjo Don Play You Wayo
9. Boys Dey Hungry for Town
10. Now You See
11. No Blame Them
12. Yeparipa
13. E No Good
14. It Don't Mean

Professional ratings
Review scores
Source	Rating
Allmusic	4/5 stars

== Personnel ==
- Seye Adewunmi – trumpet
- Oluwaseun Ajayi – keyboards
- Bose Ajila – vocals (Background)
- Akin Akinboro – percussion
- Olusola Alobalorun – trumpet
- Morufu Anifowoshe – engineer
- Femi Anikulapo-Kuti – composer, organ, saxophone, trumpet, vocals
- Opeyemi Awomolo – guitar, leader
- Daniel Bankole – baritone sax
- Dotun Bankole – tenor sax
- Anthonia Bernards – background vocals
- Tom Darnal – artwork
- Onome Kate-Udi – background vocals
- Jubril Ogungbade – engineer
- Tiwalade Ogunlowo – trombone
- Adebowale Oloko-Obi – drums
- Adekunle Osunniran – percussion, sekere
- Jolaosho Sunday – engineer
- Marc Welter – mixing assistant
- Sodi – production
