= Jazz Appreciation Month =

Music festival

Jazz Appreciation Month (JAM) is a music festival held every April in Canada and the United States, in honor of jazz as an early American art form. JAM was created in 2001 by John Edward Hasse, curator of the Smithsonian's National Museum of American History. It became a national extension of the original Jazz Awareness Month created by the Louisiana Jazz Federation in New Orleans in 1980.

Jazz Appreciation Month was created to be an annual event that would pay tribute to jazz as both a living and as a historic music. Schools, organizations, and governments celebrate JAM with free concerts and educational programs. Its first year was 2001, with funding provided by the Ella Fitzgerald Charitable Foundation, which continues to support JAM every year.

JAM culminates with the international celebration of International Jazz Day on April 30.

In 2012, Smithsonian Folkways Recordings obtained permission from the Louis Armstrong estate to release the recordings on the album Satchmo at the National Press Club: Red Beans and Rice-ly Yours and timed the release as part of the annual Jazz Appreciation Month.

In 2018 JAM celebrated the relationship between jazz and justice. The featured artist was Norman Granz.
