= Day by Day (Femi Kuti album) =

Studio album by Femi Kuti
- Released: 27 October 2008
- Genre: Afrobeat
- Label: Wrasse
- Producer: Sodi

Femi Kuti chronology
Fight to Win (2001)	Day by Day (2008)	Africa for Africa (2010)

Professional ratings
Review scores
Source	Rating
Allmusic	link

Day by Day is an album by Nigerian musician Femi Kuti released in mid-October 2008.

== Track listing ==
All tracks by Femi Kuti

1. "Oyimbo" – 3:53
2. "Eh Oh" – 4:17
3. "Day by Day" – 3:01
4. "Demo Crazy" – 7:34
5. "Do You Know" – 4:52
6. "You Better Ask Yourself" – 6:00
7. "One Two" – 2:15
8. "Tell Me" – 4:37
9. "They Will Run" – 5:25
10. "Tension Grip Africa" – 5:07
11. "Dem Funny" – 4:19
12. "Let's Make History" – 2:28

== Personnel ==
- Ademola Adegbola– Guitar
- Bose Ajila – Background Vocals
- Celine Bary – Background Vocals
- Philippe Bordas – Portraits
- Thomas Bubar – Assistant
- Vaughan Davies – Photo Courtesy
- Jacques Djeyim – Guitar
- Seb Dupuis – Editing
- Debo Folorunsho – Percussion, Drums
- Kunle Ogon Fuyi – Photo Courtesy
- Patrick Goraguer – Percussion, Keyboards, Fender Rhodes
- Guillaume Jaoul – Assistant
- Xavier Bernard Jaoul – Assistant
- Keziah Jones – Guitar
- Femi Kuti – Organ, Trumpet, Alto, Baritone, Soprano & Tenor Saxophones, Vocals
- Made Anikulapo Kuti – Alto Saxophone, Vocals
- Yeni Anikulapo Kuti – Background Vocals
- Gbenga Laleye – Trumpet
- Doris Lanzman – Background Vocals
- Morgan Marchand – Programming, Engineer, Additional Production
- Sébastien Martel – Guitar
- Bernard Matussiere – Photography
- Vladmir Nesckovic – Programming, Engineer, Additional Production
- Guy N'Sangue – Bass
- Tiwalade Ogunlowo – Trombone
- Kunle Olayode – Percussion, Drums
- Francis Onah – Tenor Saxophone
- Positive Force – Performer
- Julia Saar – Background Vocals
- Camille Sarr – Background Vocals
- Gérald Sebastien – Assistant
- Sodi – Programming, Producer, Engineer, Mixing
- Onome Udi – Background Vocals
