= Fight to Win (album) =

Studio album by Femi Kuti
- Released: 16 October 2001
- Genre: Afrobeat
- Label: MCA

Femi Kuti chronology
Shoki Shoki (1998)	Fight to Win (2001)	Day by Day (2008)

Professional ratings
Review scores
Source	Rating
Allmusic	4/5 stars

Fight to Win is an album by Nigerian musician Femi Kuti that was released in mid-October 2001.

== Track listing ==
1. "Do Your Best (ft. Mos Def)"
2. "Walk on the Right Side"
3. "Traitors of Africa"
4. "Tension Grip Nigeria"
5. "'97"
6. "Fight to Win (ft. Jaguar Wright)"
7. "Stop AIDS"
8. "Eko Lagos"
9. "Alkebu-Lan (Cradle of Civilization)"
10. "One Day Someday"
11. "The Choice Is Yours"
12. "Missing Link (ft. Common)"
