= Shoki Shoki =

1998 album by Femi Kuti

Studio album by Femi Kuti
- Released: 1998
- Genre: Afrobeat
- Label: Barclay
- Producer: Sodi

Femi Kuti chronology
Femi Kuti (1995)	Shoki Shoki (1998)	Shoki Remixed (2000)

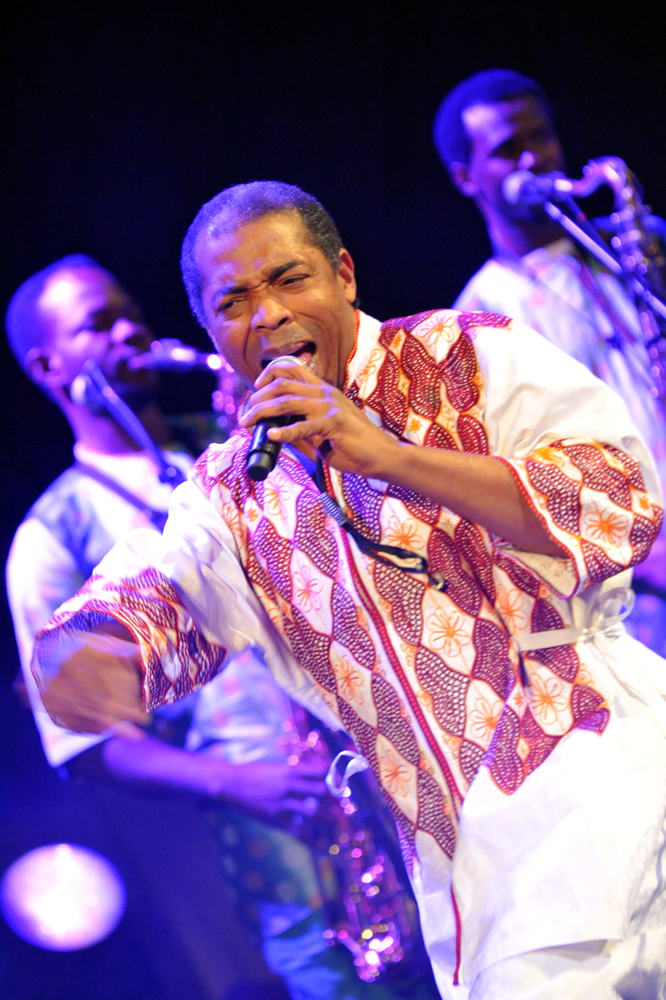
Femi Kuti, during a stage performance

Shoki Shoki is an album by the Nigerian musician Femi Kuti, released in 1998. The album was released in the United States by MCA Records in 2000. A remix album, Shoki Remixed, was released the same year.

Nigeria's military government banned the album's second track, "Beng beng beng", due to its objections to the sexual subject matter.

== Production ==
Kuti is backed by his band, Positive Force; the album was produced by Sodi and engineered by Mark Saunders.

== Critical reception ==
Professional ratings
Review scores
Source	Rating
AllMusic	3/5 stars
Robert Christgau	(dud)
Entertainment Weekly	A−
NME	3.5/5 stars
Rolling Stone	3/5 stars

NME thought that "as basslines, horns and sprightly riffs spiral in a million directions, he also proves keen to continue Fela‘s fight against a range of foes, particularly the Nigerian authorities." Entertainment Weekly stated that Kuti "brilliantly forges a link between Afrobeat and James Brown, spicing his percussive stew with acid jazz, hip-hop, and soul flavor while remaining true to his roots, proving himself an able ambassador to all rhythm nations."

Rolling Stone opined that "throughout the showy Shoki Shoki, he treats Afrobeat's basic rhythm formula as sacred, adding only slight embellishments and updates." The Windsor Star concluded that "while Fela's music often flew off into extended groove workouts, Femi packages his songs into neat arrangements with carefully punctuated horns, call-response vocal dynamics and locked-in polyrhythms."

AllMusic wrote that "like his father, he never lets the lyrically conscious material get in the way of pushing irresistible grooves."

== Track listing ==
1. "Truth don die" – 6:17
2. "Beng beng beng" – 4:43
3. "What will tomorrow bring" – 5:40
4. "Victim of life" – 6:14
5. "Blackman know yourself" – 5:15
6. "Look around" – 6:00
7. "Sorry sorry" – 6:37
8. "Eregele" – 7:15
9. "Scatta head" – 8:20

== See also ==
- Fela Kuti - Femi's father
