= No Place for My Dream =

Studio album by Femi Kuti
- Released: 25 June 2013
- Genre: Afrobeat, Caribbean
- Length: 50:29
- Label: Knitting Factory
- Producer: Sodi Marciszewer

Femi Kuti chronology
Africa for Africa (2010)	No Place for My Dream (2013)

Professional ratings
Aggregate scores
Source	Rating
Metacritic	76/100
Review scores
Source	Rating
Allmusic	4/5 stars
Exclaim!	8/10

No Place for My Dream is a studio album by Nigerian musician Femi Kuti. It was released in June 2013 under Knitting Factory Records.

== Track list ==
No.	Title	Length
1.	"Nothing to Show For it"	3:36
2.	"The World is Changing"	6:06
3.	"No Place for My Dream"	3:45
4.	"Action Time"	5:45
5.	"No Work, No Job, No Money"	5:21
6.	"Carry On Pushing On"	4:59
7.	"Politics Na Big Business"	3:44
8.	"Na So We See Am"	4:21
9.	"One Man Show"	6:19
10.	"Wey Our Money"	4:49
11.	"This Is Only the Beginning"	1:44
