= Femi Kuti =

Nigerian musician and singer-songwriter (born 1962)

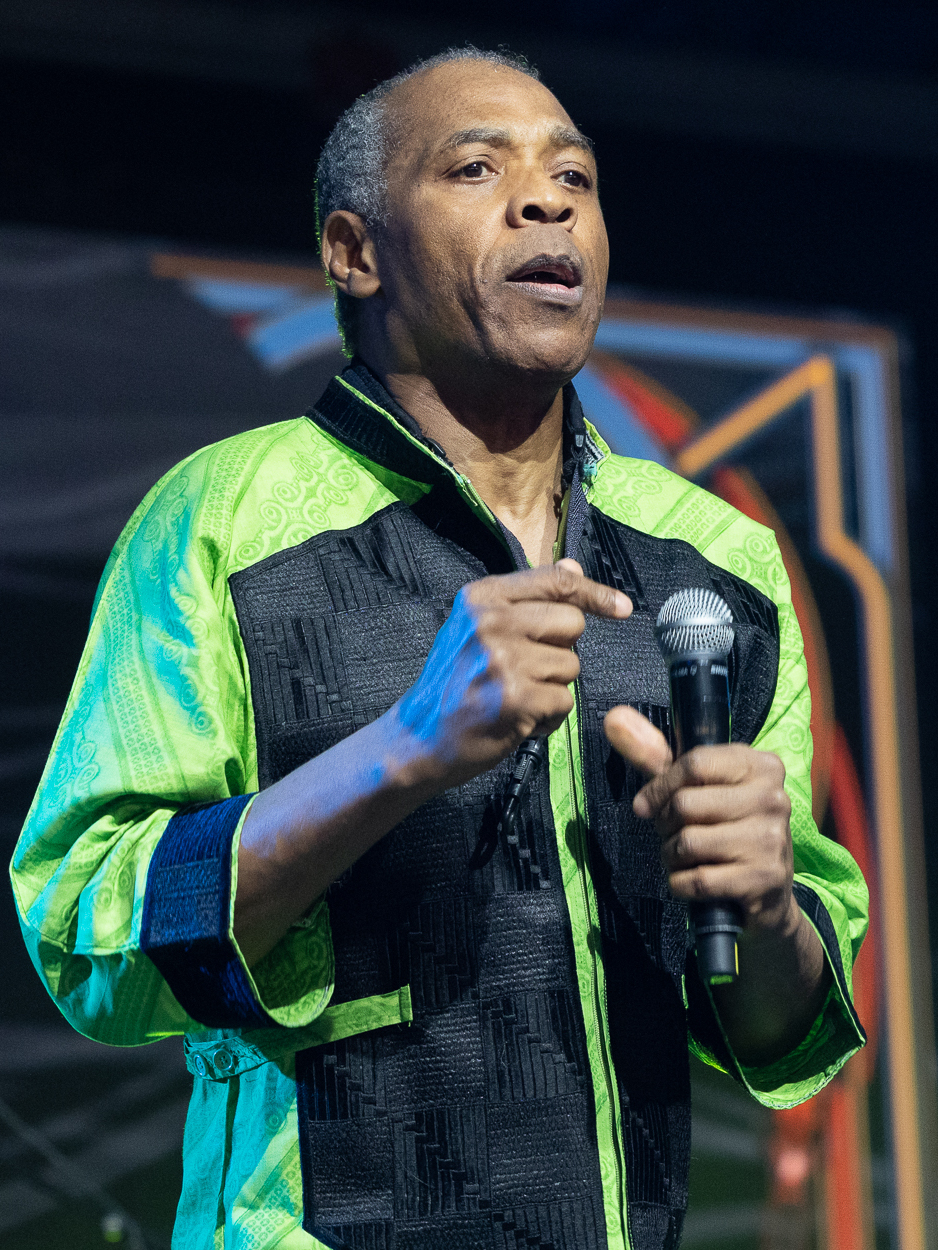
- Kuti performing in 2023

Background information
- Born: Olufela Olufemi Anikulapo Kuti; 16 June 1962 (age 64); London, England
- Origin: Lagos, Lagos State, Nigeria
- Genres: Afrobeat; jazz; Funk
- Occupations: Singer; songwriter; musician
- Instruments: Vocals; saxophone; trumpet; keyboards
- Years active: 1978–present
- Label: BMG

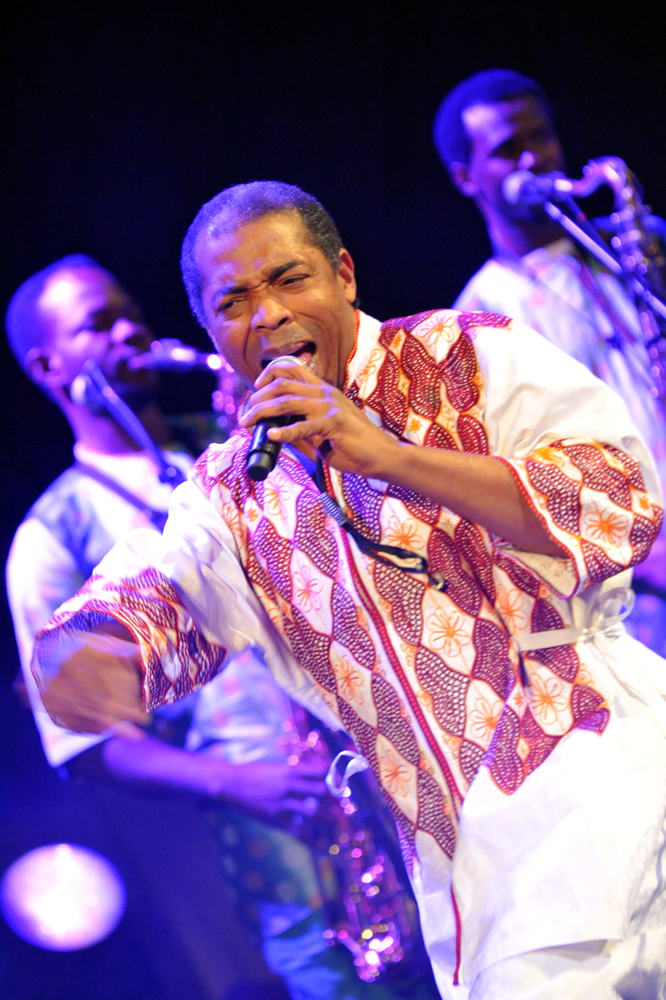
Performance at Warszawa Cross Culture Festival – 25 September 2011

Olufela Olufemi Anikulapo Kuti (born 16 June 1962), popularly known as Femi Kuti, is a Nigerian musician born in London and raised in Lagos. He is the eldest son of Afrobeat pioneer Fela Kuti and the grandson of political campaigner, women's rights activist and traditional aristocrat Funmilayo Ransome-Kuti.

Femi Kuti began his musical career playing in his father's band, Egypt 80. In 1986, Femi started his own band, Positive Force, establishing himself as an artist independent of his father's legacy.

== Biography ==
Femi Anikulapo Kuti was born in London to Fela and Remilekun (Remi) Ransome-Kuti (née Taylor; 1941-2000), and grew up in the former Nigerian capital, Lagos. His mother soon left his father, taking Femi to live with her. In 1977, however, Femi chose to move in with his father. Femi started playing the saxophone at the age of 15 and eventually became a member of his father's band. He studied at Baptist Academy and Igbobi College.

Like his father, Femi has made commitments to social and political causes throughout his career. Femi's grandmother, Funmilayo Ransome-Kuti, was a political campaigner and women's rights activist. Though Femi is the son of an international icon, he considers his mother, Remilekun Taylor, to be his greatest influence.

He created his own band, Positive Force, in the late 1980s with Dele Sosimi (Gbedu Resurrection), former keyboard player of Fela Anikulapo Kuti. His international career began in 1988 when he was invited by the French Cultural Centre in Lagos and Christian Mousset to perform at the Festival d'Angoulême (France), the New Morning Club in Paris and the Moers Festival in Germany. In 2000, Kuti joined in a duet on the track "Ala Jalkoum" on the Rachid Taha album Made in Medina.

In 2001, Femi collaborated on his album Fight to Win with a number of US musicians, including Common, Mos Def, and Jaguar Wright.

Also in 2002, Femi contributed a remake of his father's classic song "Water No Get Enemy" to Red Hot & Riot, a compilation CD in tribute to Fela Kuti that was released by the Red Hot Organization and MCA. Femi's track was created in collaboration with hip-hop and R&B artists D'Angelo, Macy Gray, The Soultronics, Nile Rodgers and Roy Hargrove, and all proceeds from the CD were donated to charities dedicated to raising AIDS awareness or fighting the disease.

Femi Kuti's voice is featured in the videogame Grand Theft Auto IV, where he is the host of radio station IF 99 (International Funk 99, described as "playing a great selection of classics from West Africa, the US and elsewhere").

"Sorry Sorry"
30-second sample

In similar fashion as his father, there have been complaints of Kuti's criticism of his homeland Nigeria, specifically in the song "Sorry Sorry", along with "What Will Tomorrow Bring" and "97".

Femi has been nominated for a Grammy Award four times in the world music category in 2003, 2010, 2012 and 2013 but has never won.

On 19 December 2014 a management deal between Chocolate City Music Group and Femi Kuti was reached. The news was announced via the Chocolate City Music official Instagram account, as well as Audu Maikori social media accounts.

On 5 February 2021, Femi Kuti and his son, Made Kuti, released their two-album project, Legacy+ under Partisan Records. The project includes Femi's eleventh album Stop the Hate and Made's debut album For(e)ward.

== Activism ==
Femi, the son of Afrobeat singer and political activist Fela Kuti, inherited his father's zeal for both music and activism. He started playing the saxophone and keyboard with his father's band when he was 16 and stepped into the spotlight, writing and singing after his father's demise. Femi remains politically inclined grooving to high energy funk, jazz and traditional African-fueled songs about political corruption, poverty and primitive living conditions suffered by most inhabitants in Nigeria's oil-rich nation.

Femi Kuti's album Africa for Africa emphasized "Bad Government" as a problem in Africa. Before the 2011 elections in Nigeria, he reached out to the people that there was "no difference between the three candidates contesting for the presidential seat in Nigeria". He added, "we could say we're moving in the democratic process. And it's probably better than going to war, but corruption is still very rampant. The people are hungry and sick. And the government controls the media, so it can't be critical".

Kuti also said: "It's a very hypocritical situation. People settle for putting a meal on the table, but they don't know that the rest of the world doesn't suffer every day from power outages and water shortage. Nigerians don't even know about the history of African slavery, because it's not included in the text books." He echoed the same sentiments in the 2015 elections by releasing a remix to the song "Politics Na Big Business" featuring Tuface Idiibia and Sound Sultan through his management company, Chocolate City.

Kuti's song "Make We Remember" calls on people to remember the words of his father and "great black people", who fought for the emancipation of Africa. For a very long time, Femi has been using music to inspire, change and motivate African people.

== Live performances ==
On 22 November 2014, Kuti performed at the BMO event, where he shared the same stage with his new label mate M.I (Jude Abaga).

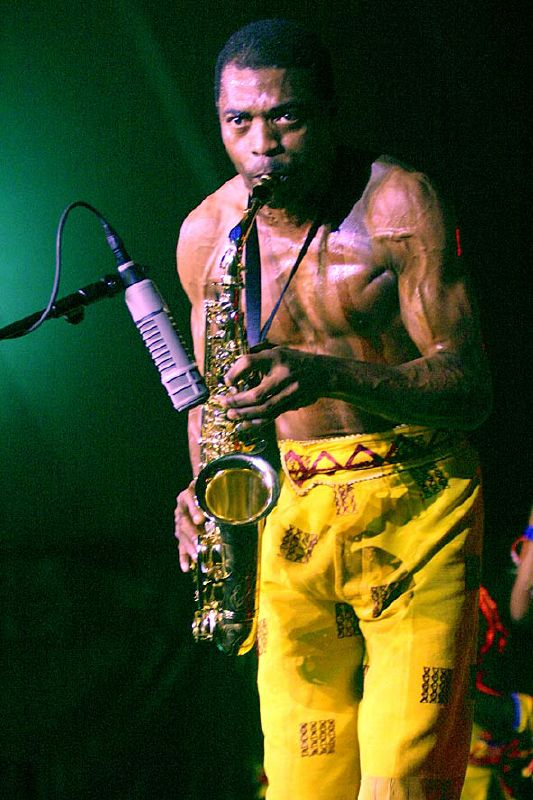
Kuti performing in London

On 24 April 2015, he performed in the 2 Kings concert alongside his brother Seun Kuti. The concert is significant as it is the first concert that the brothers have performed together.

On 15 May 2017, Kuti was referred to in the Guinness World Records under the catalog of a single note held on a sax in a method called circular breathing. He set the records at 51 min 35 seconds.

== Discography ==
=== Albums ===
- No Cause for Alarm? (1989, Polygram)
- M.Y.O.B (1991, Kalakuta Records)
- Femi Kuti (1995, Tabu/Motown)
- Shoki Shoki (1998, Barclay/Polygram/Fontana MCA)
- Fight to Win (2001, Barclay/Polygram/Fontana MCA/Wraase)
- Day by Day (2008, Wrasse Records)
- Africa for Africa (2010 /2011, Wrasse Records/Knitting Factory Records)
- No Place for My Dream (2013, Knitting Factory Records)
- One People One World (2018, Knitting Factory Records)
- Stop the Hate (2021, Partisan Records)
- Journey Through Life (2025, Partisan Records)

=== Live albums ===
- Africa Shrine (Live CD) (2004, P-Vine)
- Live at the Shrine (Deluxe Edition DVD) + Africa Shrine (Live CD) (2005, Palm Pictures/Umvd)

=== Tours ===
- Le Cabaret Suavage Black Summer Festival, Paris (Afrobeat concert, 2015)
- Garforth Festival Garforth, Leeds (2015)
- The Lantern Bristol, UK 2015
- Band on the Wall Manchester, UK, 2015
- Latitude Festival Suffolk UK, 2015
- Larmer Tree Festival Salisbury UK 2015
- Walthamstow Garden Party, London, Lloyd Park 2015

=== Collections ===
- The Best of Femi Kuti (2004, Umvd/Wrasse)
- Femi Kuti The Definitive Collection (2007, Wrasse Records)

=== Appearances ===
- "Ala Jalkoum" (on the album Rachid Taha Live) (2001, Mondo Melodia)
- "Vampires" (on the album Radio Retaliation by Thievery Corporation) (2008, ESL Music)
- "Make You Crazy" (on the album Hope for the Hopeless) by Brett Dennen (2008)
- Finding Fela (2014) a documentary film directed by Alex Gibney
- "Arabesque" (on the album Everyday Life by Coldplay) (2019)

== Awards and honours ==
As of 2022, Kuti has been nominated for six Grammy Awards in multiple categories. He was nominated four times (in 2002, 2009, 2011, and 2013) in the Best World Music Album category. For the 2022 Grammy Awards, Femi and his son Made were nominated for Best Global Music Album and Femi was nominated for Best Global Music Performance.

On October 20, 2022, Kuti was awarded as a Chevalier des arts et des lettres (Knight of the Order of Arts and Letters) by the French Ministry of Culture in Paris.

== Videography ==
Year	Title	Album	Director	Ref
2013	"The World Is Changing"	No Place for my Dreams	—N/a	

== See also ==
- Ransome-Kuti family
- Seun Kuti
- Fela Anikulapo Kuti
