= Odu (album) =

Studio album by King Sunny Adé
- Released: 17 March 1998
- Recorded: Dockside, Maurice, Louisiana
- Genre: Jùjú music
- Length: 69:57
- Label: Mesa/Atlantic
- Producer: Andrew Frankel

King Sunny Adé chronology
Ogun (1997)	Odu (1998)	Seven Degrees North (2000)

Odu is a studio album by Nigerian Jùjú musician King Sunny Adé. It was released in 1998 on Mesa/Atlantic. Recorded at Dockside Studios, Maurice, Louisiana, it was produced by Andrew Frankel and features traditional Yoruba music. Odù means oracle in the Yoruba divination system of Ifá.

Leo Stanley of AllMusic described Odu as a "rich, diverse album". In 1999, the album was nominated for a Grammy Award in the Best World Music Album category.

== Track listing ==
1. "Jigi Jigi Isapa" — 5:36
2. "Easy Motion Tourist" — 5:59
3. "Alaji Rasaki" — 5:19
4. "Mo Ri Keke Kan" — 4:04
5. "Kiti Kiti" — 6:18
6. "Natuba" — 6:15
7. "Aiye Nreti Eleya Mi" — 12:50
8. "Ibi Won Ri O" — 3:33
9. "Kawa to Bere" — 5:32
10. "Eri Okan (Conscience)" — 9:56
11. "Kini Mba Ro" — 4:35
