= Martin Meissonnier =

French musician & producer

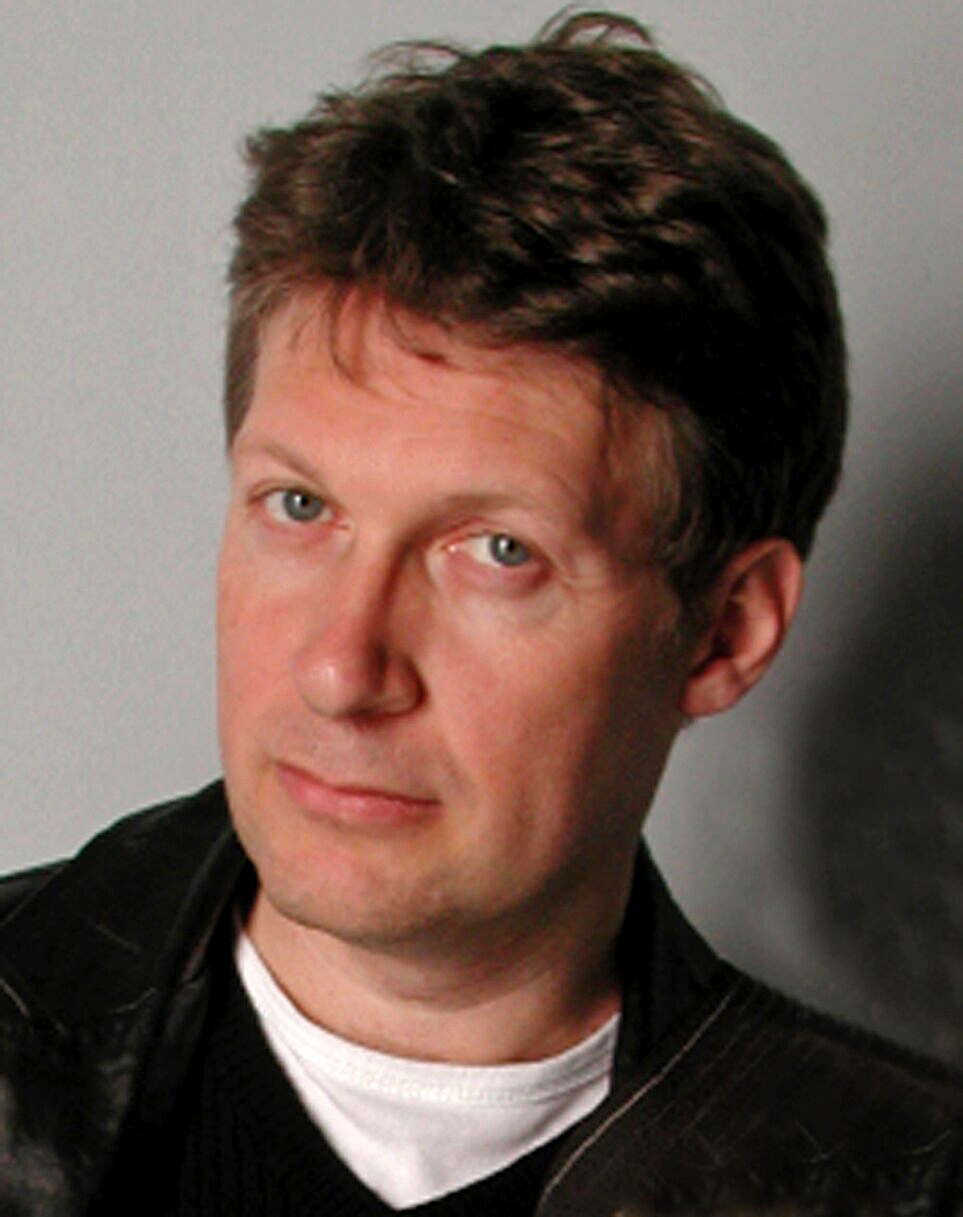
- Martin Meissonnier in the 1990s

Background information
- Origin: Paris, France
- Occupations: Film director, musician, record producer,
- Instruments: Guitar, keyboards
- Years active: 1975–present

Martin Meissonnier is a French musician, producer, journalist, and filmmaker. He is known for his work with African pop musicians such as Fela Kuti and King Sunny Adé and Khaled among other diverse artists. His producing and film directing credits include documentaries about finance, politics and history.

== Biography ==
He began as a young reporter for the legendary French daily Libération. In the 1970s as young agent, he brought numerous jazz musicians to France, such as Don Cherry, the Art Ensemble of Chicago, John Lee Hooker. He also promoted concerts for artists such as Nass El Ghiwane, Franco & OK Jazz, Nana Vasconcelos, Turkish band Oriental Wind, Han Bennink & Peter Brötzmann, Art Blakey, Sun Ra, Chico & Von Freeman, Albert Collins, Lounge Lizards, Defunkt, Dizzy Gillespie, Old & New Dreams, Art Pepper, Moondog, The Slits, Taj Mahal, Pharoah Sanders, Gil Evans, Egberto Gismonti, Rashied Ali & Andrew Cyrille and others.

In the early 1980s, he became the manager/producer of Fela Kuti, King Sunny Ade; in 1984 Ray Lema, the Malopoets from South Africa, Manu Dibango; in 1986 Papa Wemba and Wasis Diop. In 1986, he organised the first raï festival in Bobigny. As music Producer, he also worked with Khaled, Safy Boutella, Amina, Arthur H, in 1994 Robert Plant & Jimmy Page, and Alan Stivell.

In 1989 to 1994, he directed the TV series Megamix for la Sept on France 3 and then Arte, world music magazine which ran for six years on French television and other countries. Later, he directed documentary films for Arte and Canal+, including several programmes about history, the Internet, digital art, rap, and the techno movement. In 2001, his book about depleted uranium entitled Uranium appauvri : la guerre invisible was published by Robert Laffont.

Martin Meissonnier's work as a filmmaker has a strong global flavor. His producing and directing credits include major documentaries and documentary series in finance, politics and history. They include, 'Web Site Story', 'McWorld', 'Music Is My Drug', 'On the Trail of the Queen of Sheba', 'The Life of Buddha', "Vraie Jeanne, Fausse Jeanne","On God's Right"'The Genie of Electricity' and "Waste your life" a film about recycling. Since 2015 he directed and produced two films on well being in the work place"Happiness at Work" and "What Women Want at Work". Today he concentrates on 'Happiness at School' or how to reinvent school in the digital age. Accompanied by a feature-length documentary of the same name made with Canal+, Happiness@School is also a web platform where best practices in education are shared through short films.

Since 2018, he remixes congolese street music for an album on Crammed Disks "Kinshasa 78" and he also performs as a DJ for music Festivals like The TransMusicales de Rennes, Tropisme, Les Suds Arles...

As for now, he is exploring the subjects of work and new company models, since he's made researches and directed his films Happiness at Work (2015) and What Women Want at Work (2017) and Happiness at School, a web platform and film project for October 2021.

== Albums (as music producer) ==
- Don Cherry - Music/Sangam (album, 1979, Europa Records) (as co-producer with Pierre Lattès)
- Okay Temiz - Zikir (album, 1979, Sun Records/King records)
- Fela Anikulapo Kuti - Black President (album, 1981, Arista), Original Suffer Head (album, 1981, Arista)
- King Sunny Adé & his African Beats - Juju Music (album, 1982), Synchro System (album,1983), and Aura (album, 1984)
- Manu Dibango - Abele Dance (single, 1984) and Manu Seventies (album, 1988)
- Ray Lema - Medecine (album, 1985, Celluloid)
- Tony Allen - Too Many prisoners (album, 1987, Barclay)
- Afrika Bambaataa - U don't have to be a star (single, 1987, Nova) (co-producer with Yasuaki Shimizu)
- Cheb Khaled / Safy Boutella - Kutche (album, 1987, Pomme Music-Sony)
- Yasuaki Shimizu -Subliminal (album, 1988, JVC)
- Wasis Diop - Soweto Dal (single, 1988, Nova)
- Carmel - Sally remix (single, 1988, London records)
- Papa Wemba - Esclave (album, 1989, Celluloid)
- Amina - albums Yalil (1990), Wadiye (1992) and two songs on Annabi (1999)
- Arthur H - Arthur H (album, 1990, Polydor) (as co-producer with Arthur H)
- Alan Stivell - Brian Boru (album, 1995, Dreyfus)
- Robert Plant & Jimmy Page - No Quarter: Jimmy Page and Robert Plant Unledded (preproduction on the songs Yalla & A wonderful One) (1996, Mercury)
- Bigmen - Reggae + Rai (album, 2001, Virgin) featuring Gregory Isaacs, Sly & Robbie, Sugar Minott, Chaka Demus & Pliers, Cheb Anouar, Cheb Tarik, Khaled, etc...
- Seun Kuti & Fela's Egypt 80 - Many Things (album, 2008, Tôt ou Tard - Disorient Records)
- Khaled - Liberté (album, 2009, Universal)
- Louis Bertignac - Grizzly (ça c’est vraiment moi) (album, 2010, Polydor)
- Aziz Sahmaoui - University of Gnawa (album, 2011, General Pattern)
- Maïa Barouh Kodama (2015 Saravah)
- Aziz Sahmaoui - Poetic Trance (2019 Blue Line)
- Kinshasa 78 reconstructions (2020 Crammed Discs) with Konono N°1, Orchestre Sankayi, Orchestre Bambala, originals & remixes of 1978 recordings by Bernard Treton in Kinshasa
- Giuliano Gabriele - Basta! (2024 Coming MusicArt, Giro Music)

== Soundtracks (composer) ==
- Walking Around, a short film directed by Gilles Bovon (2022)
- Les cercueils de monsieur Kani Kwé by Thierry Secrétan (1987, La Générale de Production cinématographique)
- Kaltex en Chine (1988, Kaltex)
- Music of the opening and closing ceremonies at the 1992 Winter Olympics in Albertville - « Victoire de la Musique » 92 - « Prix de la Musique Symphonique Légère de la SACEM »
- Joe et Marie by Tania Stöcklin (1993)
- Peintres de Kumasi by Thierry Secrétan (1995, Online/Arte)
- Les Guignols de l'Info, TV series (1995–2010, Canal+)
- Tripalium by Christophe Loizillon (1996 – Vertigo productions)
- Les 100 photos du Siècle, documentary (1998, Capa)
- Spin Doctors, documentary by Luc Hermann & Gilles Bovon (2001, Canal+)
- République Atomique documentary by David Carr Brown (2001, Artline/ARTE)
- Inside Broadmoor, documentary by David Carr Brown (2002, Psychology News UK/Channel 5 UK)
- l’Affaire Clearstream, documentary by Denis Robert (2003, The Factory/Canal +)
- Death of Diana, documentary by David Carr Brown (2003, Psychology News UK/ABC-Channel 5 UK)
- The Great Match, film by Gerardo Olivares (2006, Wanda Films) (in competition at Berlinale 2006)
- Reporters, series directed by Suzan Fenn & Ivan Straburg (2007–2009, Capa Drama/Canal+)
- Saviors in the Night, film by Ludi Boeken (2009, Acajou Films, Pandora, Filmforum)
- Rose, c'est Paris, film by Bettina Rheims & Serge Bramly (2010, Arte/Productions Campagne Première)

== Collaborations on soundtracks ==
- O.C. & Stiggs, film by Robert Altman, collaboration with King Sunny Adé as producer/manager (1984, MGM)
- Black Mic-Mac film by Thomas Gilou, collaboration with Ray Lema as musical director (1985, Barclay)
- Arizona Dream film by Emir Kusturica, collaboration with Goran Bregovic and Iggy Pop (1991, Mercury)
- Dirty Pretty Things film by Stephen Frears with the song Life is Good by Martin Meissonnier/Larbi Dida/U-Roy (2002)

== Documentary films (director) ==
- Music is my Drug/Psychedelic Trance (1996, 52', Compagnie des Phares et Balises/Canal+)
- Internet - un monde digital with Alvin Toffler, Louis Rosetto (1996, 120', Série Limitée/Arte)
- Time Guardians (1997, 60', The Factory/Canal+)
- The Wheel of Destiny on Astrology around the world, shot in India, Hong Kong, Guatemala, Mali... (1998, 2x52', The Factory/Arte)
- www.monde with Jean-Marie Messier, Serge Tchuruk, Michael Bloomberg about the Net Economy and banking (1998, 110', Gaumont Television/Arte)
- Web Site Story (1999, 4x26', Gaumont Television/European Community/Arte) (compilation of www.monde & Internet : un monde digital).
- In the Footsteps of the Queen of Sheba shot in Yemen, Ethiopia & Israel (1999, 2x52', Gaumont Television/Arte/SBS/AVRO)
- Invisible War, Depleted Uranium and the Politics of Radiation (2000, 64', Canal+) « Grand Prize » of the Sinergie scientific film festival 2001
- Paroles de Juges with judges Eva Joly, Renaud Van Ruymbecke, Gerardo Colombo etc... (2000, 90', Tetra Media/Arte)
- Une Europe sans Loi with judges Eva Joly, Renaud Van Ruymbecke, Gerardo Colombo etc... (2000, 52', Tetra Media/la Cinquième)
- Mc World - Brand Culture featuring Benjamin Barber, Eric Schlosser, Dan Wieden... (2002, 90', Sodaperaga/Arte) « Prix Leonardo » for best European production 2002 - Italy
- The Life of Buddha (2003, 90', General Pattern/Infine films/Buddhist Broadcasting Foundation/Arte/SBS)
- On God's Right, in collaboration with Roger Trilling (2004, 55', Productions Campagne Première/Canal+/SBS Australia)
- Africa Live - Roll Back Malaria, five concert films, featuring Youssou N'Dour, Tiken Jah Fakoly, Corneille, Awadi & others (2005, 300', Antelope Films/Ideale Audience/Flotow Productions/Xippi)
- Vraie Jeanne Fausse Jeanne (Inquest on Joan of Arc) (2007, 90', Arte/Productions Campagne Première)
- Poubelle la vie(Belgium title) or "Ma poubelle est un trésor", co-directed by Pascal Signolet (2010, 90', Productions Campagne Première/France 3/RTBF)
- Dancing City Johannesburg (2012 Campagne Première/France O/Voyage)
- La fée Electricité co-directed by Pascal Signolet (2012 Productions Campagne Première/France 5)
- Happiness at Work Le Bonheur au Travail(2015 Productions Campagne Première/Lux Fugit Films/ARTE/RTBF
- Le Travail a-t-il un sexe? or "What Women Want at Work" (2018 Productions Campagne Première/France 5)
- Paris London: Music Connections (2019 (Productions Campagne Première/Musée de la Porte Dorée)
- Happiness at School or Le Bonheur à l'École film 90minutes for CANAL+Docs(2021 Productions Campagne Première)
- Happiness at School or Le Bonheur à l'École3 x 52mn for CANAL+Kids (2022 Productions Campagne Première)
