= King Sunny Adé =

Nigerian musician (born 1946)

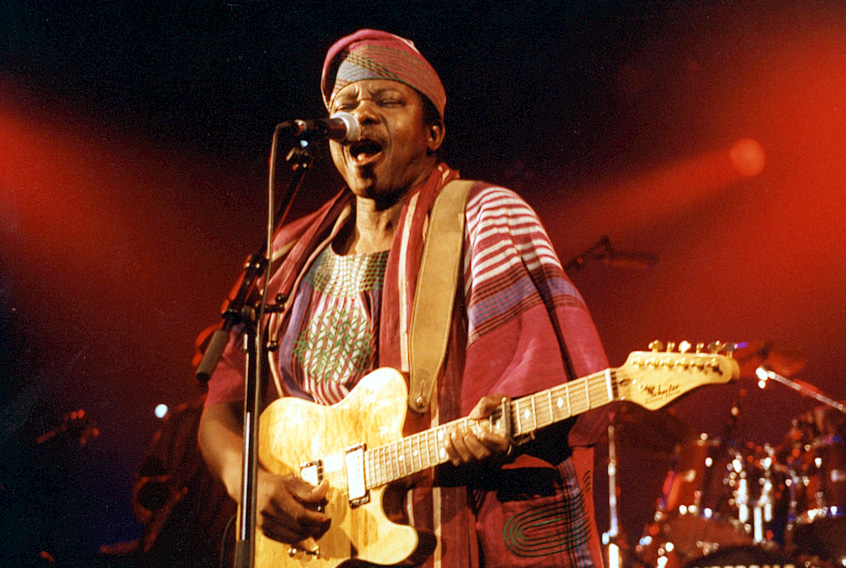

Background information
- Born: Sunday Adeniyi Adegeye; 22 September 1946 (age 80); Ondo, Southern Region, Ondo State, Nigeria)
- Genres: Jùjú, African pop
- Occupations: Singer, musician
- Years active: 1960s–present
- Labels: Island, Sunny Alade, I.R.S., Provogue, African Songs, Sigma Park, Master Disk

Chief Sunday Adeniyi Adegeye MFR (Yoruba: Sunday Adéníyì Adégẹyè; born 22 September 1946), known professionally as King Sunny Adé, is a Nigerian jùjú singer, songwriter, and multi-instrumentalist. He is regarded as one of the first African pop musicians to gain international success and has been called one of the most influential musicians of all time.

Sunny Adé formed his backing band in 1967, eventually known as his African Beats. After achieving national success in Nigeria during the 1970s and founding his own independent label, Sunny Adé signed to Island Records in 1982 and achieved international success with the albums Juju Music (1982) and Synchro System (1983); the latter garnered him a Grammy nomination, a first for a Nigerian artist. His 1998 album Odu also garnered a Grammy nomination. Sunny Adé served as board chairman of the Musical Copyright Society of Nigeria before it got licensed and was later appointed honorary president of the society in recognition of his leadership role in the society.

== Early life ==
Sunny Adé was born in Osogbo to a Nigerian royal family from Ondo and Akure, making him an Omoba of the Yoruba people. His father was a church organist, while his mother, Maria Adegeye, was a trader. As a member of the Adesida dynasty, his mother's relatives included Oba Adesida I (who ruled Akure for 60 years).

== Career ==
Sunny Adé left grammar school in Ondo City under the pretense of going to the University of Lagos. It was thus in Lagos that his eclectic musical career began.

Sunny Adé's musical sound has evolved from the early days. His career began with Moses Olaiya's Federal Rhythm Dandies, a highlife band. He left to form a new band, The Green Spots, in 1967. Over the years, for various reasons ranging from changes in his music to business concerns, Sunny Adé's band changed its name several times, first to African Beats and then to Golden Mercury.

King Sunny Ade was influenced by Juju pioneer Tunde Nightingale and borrowed stylistic elements from his ‘So wa nbe’ style of juju.

He founded the King Sunny Ade Foundation, an organization that includes a performing arts center, a state-of-the-art recording studio, and housing for young musicians.

He is a visiting lecturer at the Obafemi Awolowo University, Ile-Ife, and a recipient of the Order of the Federal Republic. He is the first Nigerian ever to be nominated for the Grammys.

== Stage performances ==
After over a decade of resounding success in his native Nigeria, Sunny Adé received great acclaim in Europe and North America in 1982. The global release of Juju Music and its accompanying tour was "almost unanimously embraced by critics (if not consumers) everywhere". Sunny Adé was described in The New York Times as "one of the world's great band leaders", in Record as "a breath of fresh air, a positive vibration we will feel for some time to come" and in Trouser Press as "one of the most captivating and important musical artists anywhere in the world". Sunny Adé‘s stage show was characterized by top musicianship, highlighted by his guitar mastery, and dexterous dancing. The live performances were also usually significantly longer than the two hours or less that had become the norm for concerts in North America and Europe.

His next album, Syncro System (1983), was equally successful, earned him his first Grammy Award nomination in the ethnic/traditional folk recording category, hence making him the first Nigerian Grammy award nominee ever

On 16 July 2017, King Sunny Ade announced that he would be returning to the stage in London alongside his rival act Ebenezer Obey for a musical comeback themed A Night 2 Remember with the Legends

In 2017, he was appointed ambassador for the "Change Begins With Me" campaign by the Nigerian Minister of Information Lai Mohammed.

== A fusion of sounds ==
Sunny Adé's music is characterized by, among other instruments, the talking drum – an instrument indigenous to his Yoruba roots, the guitar and his peculiar application to jùjú music. His music is in the age-old tradition of singing poetic lyrics (ewi in Yoruba) and praise singing of dignitaries as well as components of Juju (traditional African belief) called the Ogede (casting of spells). Hence, Sunny Adé's music constitutes a record of the oral tradition of his people for posterity.

Sunny Adé introduced the pedal steel guitar to Nigerian pop music. He introduced the use of synthesizers, clarinet, vibraphone, tenor guitar into the jùjú music repertoire such as dub and wah-wah guitar licks. Sunny Adé said he used these instruments not as an attempt to innovate, but as a substitute for traditional jùjú instruments which were too difficult to find and/or impractical for touring. The pedal steel guitar, for instance, was added to his repertoire as a sound-alike for an African violin.

Sunny Adé with his band invented his unique sound and instrumental which he mostly uses as an entrance song during live performances. The sound was made with a phalanx of electric guitars that functions like a percussion section and talking drums that sound like a gossipy Greek chorus.

== Island records ==
After the death of Bob Marley, Island Records began looking for another third world artist to put on its contract, while Fela Kuti had just been signed by Arista Records. Producer Martin Meissonnier introduced King Sunny Adé to Chris Blackwell, leading to the release of Juju Music in 1982. Robert Palmer claims to have brought King Sunny Adé to Island's attention, his familiarity being from his life on Malta in the 1960s listening to African Radio and Armed Forces Radio. Sunny Adé gained a wide following with this album and was soon billed as "the African Bob Marley".

King Sunny Ade parted ways with Island records after the production of 1983's Synchro System and 1984's Aura.

== Collaborations ==
Sunny Ade has collaborated with major artists such as Manu Dibango (Wakafrika) and Stevie Wonder (who played harmonica on Aura), as well as younger Nigerian artists such as Wasiu Alabi Pasuma and Bola Abimbola.

Sunny Adé's brief period of recordings with Island Records opened the floodgates for other world music artists like Senegalese Youssou N'Dour, Mali's Salif Keita, and many others.

== Later career ==
=== 1987 comeback ===
In 1987, Sunny Adé returned to the international spotlight when Rykodisc released a recording of a live concert he did in Seattle.

He soon employed an American manager, Andrew Frankel, who negotiated another three-album record deal with the Mesa record label (a division of Paradise Group) in America. One of these albums was 1988's Odu, a collection of traditional Yoruba songs, for which he was nominated for the second Grammy Award and thus making him the first African to be nominated twice for a Grammy. Apart from being an international musician Sunny Adé is also prominent in his native Nigeria, running multiple companies in several industries, creating a non-profit organisation called the King Sunny Adé Foundation, and working with the Musical Copyright Society of Nigeria.

In recent times, hip-hop music appears to be holding sway with the electronic media in Nigeria with massive airplay. Nonetheless, Sunny Adé's musical output has continued to inspire a vast generation of other Nigerian musicians, who believe in the big band musical set up which Sunny Adé and late Fela Kuti are noted for. The musician Lagbaja is one of the many musicians whom Sunny Adé's music has inspired. In 2008, his contributions to world music were recognized, as he was given an award for his outstanding contribution to world music at the International Reggae and World Music Awards held at the Apollo Theater in Harlem, New York.

=== 2009 comeback ===
At the beginning of another round of tours in the United States and Canada, Sunny Adé, now known as The chairman in his home country, was appointed a visiting professor of music at the Obafemi Awolowo University in Ile-Ife. In July of that same year, King Sunny Adé was inducted into the Afropop Hall of Fame, at the Brooklyn African Festival in the United States. He dedicated the award to Michael Jackson.

== Acting career ==
In the 1980s, Sunny Adé did some work in Hollywood. His music was featured in the 1983 film Breathless, starring Richard Gere, and the 1986 comedy One More Saturday Night, and he acted in Robert Altman's 1987 comedy O.C. and Stiggs. He featured in a few Nollywood movies in the early 2000s.

== Awards ==
Sunny Adé has received numerous awards during his career. In November 2016 he became a recipient of the AFRIMA award. In December 2016 he was inducted into Hard Rock Cafe hall of fame. He was inducted into The Headies Hall of Fame at The Headies 2020 in February 2021.

== Filmography ==
Film	Role	Year
Breathless	King Sunny Adé (Music)	1983
O.C. and Stiggs	King Sunny Adé (Music & appearance)	1985 (Filmed 1983)
One More Saturday Night	King Sunny Adé (Music)	1986
Fifty	King Sunny Adé (Music & appearance)	2015
Alakada: Bad and Boujee	King Sunny Adé (Music & appearance)	2024
