= Tems discography =

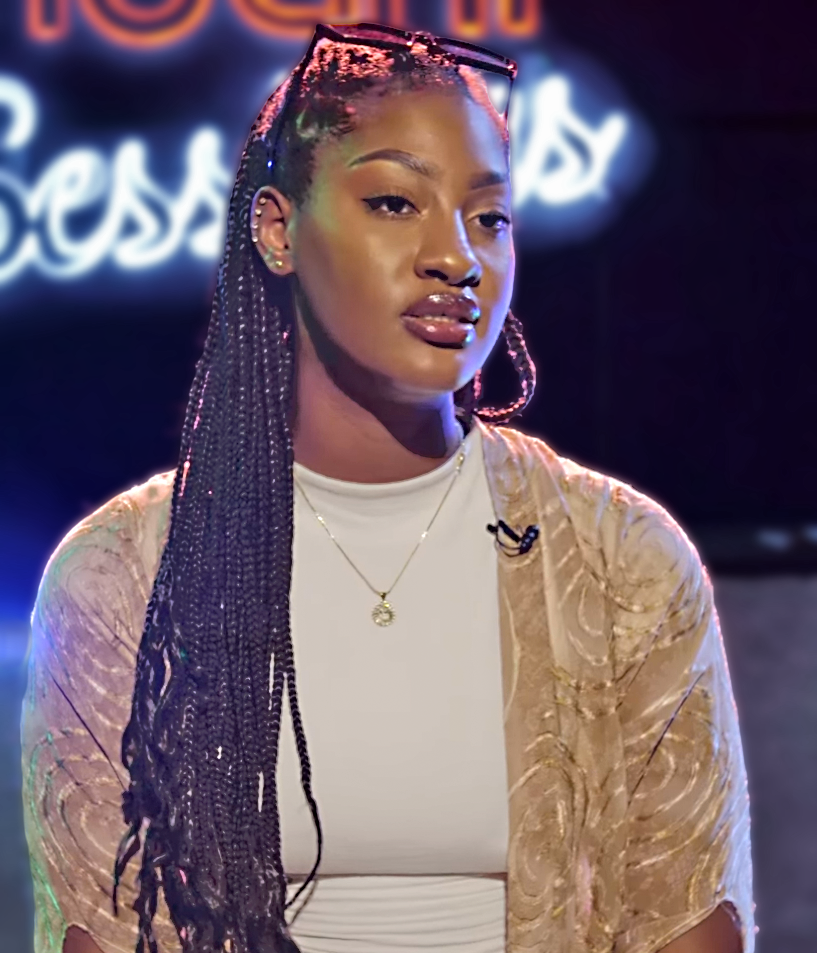
- Studio albums: 1
- EPs: 3
- Soundtrack albums: 1
- Singles: 15
- Music videos: 9

Nigerian singer-songwriter and record producer Tems has released one studio album, three extended plays (EPs), one soundtrack album (alongside Rihanna), and 15 singles (3 of which as a featured artist). In 2020, Tems released her debut EP For Broken Ears, which contained the single "Damages" and later "Free Mind" which impacted US contemporary radio as a single in 2022, it debuted on the Billboard Hot 100, peaking at number 46 and breaking the female record for longest charting number one song on the R&B/Hip-Hop Airplay chart. In 2021, Tems was featured on the Wizkid's single "Essence". It spawned a remix with Justin Bieber and became the first Nigerian song to chart on Billboard's Hot 100 of which it peaked at number 9 and Global 200 chart. Essence was certified four-times platinum by the Recording Industry Association of America (RIAA). In the same year, Tems released her second EP If Orange Was a Place, after signing with RCA Records.

In 2022, Tems' vocals from her song "Higher" were sampled by Future on his single, "Wait for U", which led to her being credited as a featured artist alongside Drake on the song. It debuted atop the Billboard Hot 100, making her the first African artist to debut at number one and the second Nigerian artist to top the chart. The song received a 3× platinum certification in the United States and also a platinum certification in the United Kingdom.

In 2023, Tems released the single "Me & U", her first solo single since her second EP, If Orange Was a Place. "Me & U" peaked at number 1 on the UK Afrobeats Singles Chart and number 34 on the UK Singles Chart, while in the United States, it reached number 10 on the Bubbling Under Hot 100 chart.

In June 2024, Tems released her debut 18-track album Born in the Wild.

== Albums ==
=== Studio albums ===
List of studio albums, with selected details
Title	Album details	Peak chart positions								Certification
Title	Album details	NGR	BEL (FL)	CAN	FRA	NLD	SWI	UK	US	Certification
Born in the Wild	Released: 7 June 2024; Label: RCA; Formats: Digital download, streaming	3	86	52	74	28	22	25	56	RMNZ: Gold; BPI: Silver

=== Soundtrack albums ===
List of soundtrack albums, with selected chart positions, sales figures and certifications
Title	Album details	Peak chart positions									
Title	Album details	AUS	BEL (FL)	CAN	FRA	GER	IRL	NZ	SWI	UK	US
Black Panther: Wakanda Forever – Music from and Inspired By (with Rihanna and various artists)	Released: 4 November 2022 (US); Label: Roc Nation, Def Jam, Hollywood; Formats: CD, LP, digital download, streaming	79	50	7	47	73	2	17	31	3	12
"Children of Blood & Bones Music From The & Inspired By (with Various artists)	Released: TBA; Label : Def Jam , Paramount Pictures; Formats: LP, digital download, streaming	To Be Released									

== Extended plays ==
List of extended plays, with selected details
Title	EP details	Peak chart positions	
Title	EP details	POR	US World
For Broken Ears	Released: 25 September 2020; Label: Leading Vibe; Formats: Digital download, streaming	—	—
If Orange Was a Place	Released: 15 September 2021; Label: Since '93, RCA; Formats: Digital download, streaming	—	7
Love Is a Kingdom	Released: 21 November 2025; Label: Since '93, RCA; Formats: Digital download, streaming	108	2

== Singles ==
=== As lead artist ===
List of singles as lead artist, with year released and album shown
Title	Year	Peak chart positions										Certifications	Album
Title	Year	NGR	AUS Hit.	IRE	NLD	NZ Hot	UK	US	US R&B/HH	US R&B	US World	Certifications	Album
"Mr Rebel"	2018	—	—	—	—	—	—	—	—	—	—		Non-album singles
"Looku Looku"	2019	—	—	—	—	—	—	—	—	—	—		Non-album singles
"Try Me"	2019	—	—	—	—	—	—	—	—	—	—		Non-album singles
"These Days"	2020	—	—	—	—	—	—	—	—	—	—		Non-album singles
"Damages"	2020	6	—	—	—	—	—	—	—	—	—	TCSN: Gold; MC: Gold; BPI: Silver	For Broken Ears
"Crazy Tings"	2021	—	—	—	—	—	—	—	—	—	—		If Orange Was a Place
"No Woman, No Cry" (with Marvel)	2022	—	—	—	—	—	—	—	—	—	1		Black Panther: Wakanda Forever
"Free Mind"	2022	—	—	—	—	—	—	46	12	4	—	BPI: Gold; MC: Platinum; RIAA: 2× Platinum; RMNZ: Platinum	For Broken Ears
"Me & U"	2023	8	—	—	— (Note: "Me & U" did not enter the Dutch Single Top 100, but peaked at number seven on the Dutch Single Tip chart.)	22	34	— (Note: "Me & U" did not enter the Billboard Hot 100, but peaked at number 10 on the Bubbling Under Hot 100 chart.)	— (Note: "Me & U" did not enter the Billboard Hot R&B/Hip-hop chart, but peaked at number 25 on the R&B/Hip-Hop Airplay chart.)	12	5	TCSN: Platinum; BPI: Platinum; MC: Gold; SWI: Gold; RIAA: Gold; RMNZ: Platinum	Born in the Wild
"Not an Angel"	2023	—	—	—	—	28	—	—	—	23	9		Non-album single
"Love Me JeJe"	2024	14	20	97	92	11	36	—	41	7	5	TCSN: Gold; BPI: Gold; RMNZ: Platinum	Born in the Wild
"Burning"	2024	72	—	—	—	—	—	—	—	15	9		Born in the Wild
"Isaka II (6am)" (with Ciza and Omah Lay)	2025	10	—	—	—	—	—	—	—	—	—	TCSN: Platinum	Non-album single
"What You Need"	2025	78	—	—	—	22	—	29	3	2	—		Love Is a Kingdom
"African Love Song"	2026	—	—	—	—	—	—	—	—	—	—		Children of Blood and Bone
"—" denotes a recording that did not chart or was not released in that territory.

=== As featured artist ===
List of singles as featured artist, with year released, selected chart positions, certifications, and album name shown
Title	Year	Peak chart positions										Certifications	Album
Title	Year	NGR	AUS	CAN	IRE	NZ	SWE	SWI	UK	US	WW	Certifications	Album
"Know Your Worth" (Khalid and Disclosure featuring Davido and Tems)	2020	—	—	—	—	— (Note: "Know Your Worth" did not enter the NZ Top 40 Singles Chart, but peaked at number 20 on the NZ Hot Singles Chart.)	—	—	—	—	—		Non-album singles
"Essence" (Wizkid featuring Tems or also Justin Bieber)	2021	—	—	30	41	15	— (Note: "Essence" did not enter the Sweden Singles Top 100 Chart, but peaked at number 1 on the Swedish Heatseakers Chart.)	95	16	9	28	TCSN: 2× Platinum; BPI: Platinum; MC: 2× Platinum; IFPI SWI: Platinum; RIAA: 4× Platinum; RMNZ: 2× Platinum	Made in Lagos
"Wait for U" (Future featuring Drake and Tems)	2022	—	12	3	21	7	— (Note: "Wait for U" did not enter the Sweden Singles Top 100 Chart, but peaked at number 1 on the Swedish Heatseakers Chart.)	34	8	1	2	TCSN: 2× Platinum; ARIA: 2× Platinum; BPI: 2× Platinum; MC: 2× Platinum; RIAA: 11× Platinum; RMNZ: 3× Platinum	I Never Liked You
"Raindance" (Dave featuring Tems)	2025	7	8	25	6	5	4	2	1	42	12	TCSN: Gold; ARIA: Platinum; BPI: 2× Platinum; MC: Platinum; IFPI DEN: Platinum; AFP: Platinum; RMNZ: 2× Platinum; SNEP: Gold	The Boy Who Played the Harp
"—" denotes a recording that did not chart or was not released in that territory.

== Other charted and certified songs ==
List of other charted songs, with year released, selected chart positions, certification and album name shown
Title	Year	Peak chart positions										Certification	Album
Title	Year	NGR	AUS	CAN	FRA	NZ Hot	UK	US	US R&B/HH	US R&B	WW	Certification	Album
"Higher"	2020	—	—	—	—	—	—	—	—	—	—	MC: Gold; BPI: Silver; RIAA: Platinum; RMNZ: Platinum	For Broken Ears
"Fountains" (Drake featuring Tems)	2021	—	36	36	70	—	— (Note: "Fountains" did not enter the UK Singles Chart, as chart rules only allow three songs per artist to chart within the top 100 at a time, but peaked at number 23 on the UK Streaming Chart.)	26	18	2	26	ARIA: Gold; BPI: Silver	Certified Lover Boy
"Found" (featuring Brent Faiyaz)	2021	—	—	—	—	22	—	—	—	17	—	MC: Gold; RIAA: Gold; RMNZ: Gold	If Orange Was a Place
"Move" (Beyoncé featuring Grace Jones and Tems)	2022	—	—	72	—	—	— (Note: "Move" did not enter the UK Singles Chart, as chart rules only allow three songs per artist to chart within the top 100 at a time, but peaked at number 76 on the UK Streaming Chart.)	55	22	15	53	RIAA: Gold; PMB: Platinum	Renaissance
"No.1" (Tyla featuring Tems)	2024	—	—	—	—	26	—	—	—	13	—		Tyla
"Free Fall" (featuring J. Cole)	2024	—	—	—	—	23	—	—	—	11	—		Born in the Wild
"I Think You're Special" (with Justin Bieber)	2025	—	—	80	—	7	—	—	—	—	—		Swag II
"Big Daddy"	2025	63	—	—	—	39	—	—	—	—	—		Love Is a Kingdom
"Bunce Road Blues" (with J. Cole and Future)	2026	69	—	55	—	—	59	34	13	—	75		The Fall-Off
"—" denotes a recording that did not chart or was not released in that territory.

== Guest appearances ==
List of non-single guest appearances, with other performing artists, showing year released and album name
Title	Year	Other artist(s)	Album
"Falling"	2018	Ladipoe	T. A. P (Talk About Poe)
"Too Bad"	2019	Show Dem Camp, Amaarae	—N/a
"Tales by Moonlight"	2019	Show Dem Camp	Palm Wine Xpress
"Good Time"	2019	Lady Donli	Enjoy Your Life
"Soon"	2020	Black Magic	—N/a
"Decided"	2020	Odunsi (the Engine)	—N/a
"Trouble"	2020	DRB Lasgidi	The Pioneers
"Peace"	2020	Mannywellz	Mirage
"Live Life"	2022	Show Dem Camp	Palm Wine Music Vol. 3
"Ordinary People (Man-Man Remix)"	2024	John Legend	Get Lifted (20th Anniversary)
"Bunce Road Blues"	2026	J. Cole, Future	The Fall-Off

== Songwriting and other appearances ==
#	Song	Year	Artist	Album	Contribution
1	"Hide & Seek"	2022	Stormzy	This Is What I Mean	Song writing
2	"Lift Me Up"	2022	Rihanna	Black Panther: Wakanda Forever	Song writing, Background Vocals
3	"25"	2024	Rod Wave	Last Lap	Songwriting
4	"Need It"	2025	Justin Bieber	Swag II	Songwriting, Background vocals

== See also ==
- Category:Tems albums
- Category:Tems songs
