= List of awards and nominations received by Tems =

Tems awards and nominations
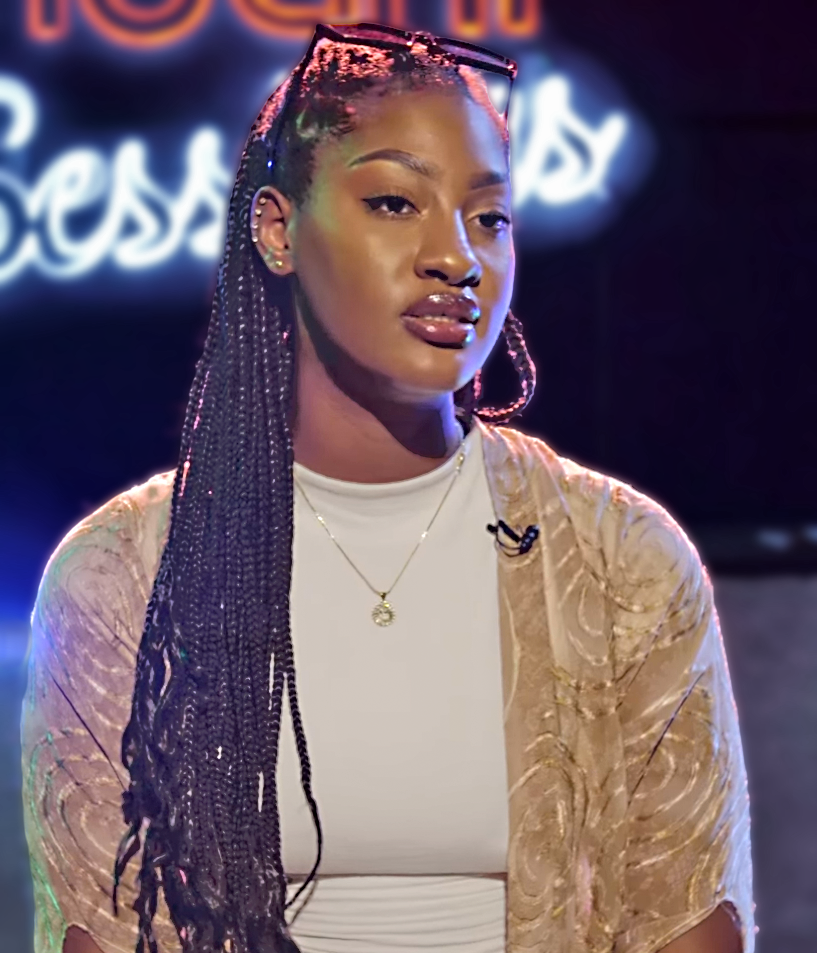
- Tems in 2019
Awards and nominations
Award	Wins	Nominations
Academy Awards	0	1
All Africa Music Awards	3	8
American Music Awards	2	4
BET Awards	4	9
BET Hip Hop Awards	1	3
Black Reel Awards	1	1
Critics' Choice Awards	0	1
Golden Globe Awards	0	1
Grammy Awards	2	12
Hollywood Music in Media Awards	1	2
iHeartRadio Music Awards	2	6
MTV Europe Music Awards	0	3
MTV Video Music Awards	0	4
NAACP Image Awards	4	10
Satellite Awards	0	1
Soul Train Music Awards	2	8
The Headies	5	13
People's Choice Awards	0	1
South African Music Awards	1	2

Totals (Note: Certain award groups do not simply award one winner. They acknowledge several different recipients, have runners-up, and have third place. Since this is a specific recognition and is different from losing an award, runner-up mentions are considered wins in this award tally. For simplification and to avoid errors, each award in this list has been presumed to have had a prior nomination.)
- Wins: 42
- Nominations: 121

This is a list of awards and nominations received by Nigerian singer and songwriter, Tems. Considered one of the most critically acclaimed African artists, Tems was honored with the Prize for Music at The Future Awards Africa and the Impact Award at the BMI London Awards in recognition of her "ground-breaking artistry, creative vision and impact on the future of music".

In 2020, Tems released her debut EP For Broken Ears, promoted by the single "Damages". The EP was nominated for awards at the All Africa Music Awards and The Beatz Awards. Her collaboration on Wizkid's "Essence", received critical acclaim, it was nominated for the Grammy Award for Best Global Music Performance. The song also won several awards at the BET Awards, NAACP Image Awards, The Headies Awards and at the Soul Train Music Awards.

In 2021, Tems released her second EP If Orange Was a Place, which won The Headies Award for Best R&B Album. She was featured on Future's "Wait for U" with alongside Drake, which received nomination for the Grammy Award for Best Rap Song and won the Best Melodic Rap Performance, an American Music Awards and a BET Hip Hop Awards. In 2022 Tems contributed to Beyoncé's seventh studio album Renaissance on the track "Move" alongside Grace Jones, receiving nominations at the NAACP Image Awards and Soul Train Music Awards.

Tems worked with Ludwig Göransson, Ryan Coogler and Rihanna to score Black Panther: Wakanda Forever Soundtrack, co-writing "Lift Me Up", the film's original song performed by Rihanna. The song was nominated at the Academy Award for Best Original Song, earning the same nominations at the Golden Globe Awards, Critics' Choice Awards and Satellite Awards. It also received a nomination at the Grammy Award for Best Song Written for Visual Media. She also performed "No Woman No Cry" for the soundtrack, receiving the nominations at the All Africa Music Awards and NAACP Image Awards.

In March 2024, Tems became the first African singer to be awarded a Billboard Women in Music Award in which she received under the Breakthrough category.

In 2025, Tems won the Grammy Award for Best African Music Performance, becoming the only Nigerian artist with multiple Grammys.

== Awards and nominations ==
Award	Year	Category	Work	Result	Ref.
Academy Awards	2023	Best Original Song	"Lift Me Up" (as songwriter)	Nominated	
African-American Film Critics Association	2023	Best Song	"Lift Me Up" (as songwriter)	Won	
African Entertainment Awards USA	2021	Best Female Artist	Herself	Won	
African Entertainment Awards USA	2021	Artist of the Year	Herself	Nominated	
African Entertainment Awards USA	2021	Best Female Artist – Central/West Africa	Herself	Nominated	
African Entertainment Awards USA	2021	Best Collaboration	"Essence" (Wizkid feat. Tems)	Won	
African Entertainment Awards USA	2021	Best Video	"Essence" (Wizkid feat. Tems)	Won	
African Entertainment Awards USA	2021	Song of the Year	"Essence" (Wizkid feat. Tems)	Won	
African Entertainment Awards USA	2022	Best Female Artist – Central/West Africa	Herself	Nominated	
African Entertainment Awards USA	2022	Best Collaboration	"Wait for U" (Future, Drake & Tems)	Nominated	
Afro X Digitals Awards	2021	Pop Song of the Year (Female)	"Damages"	Won	
All Africa Music Awards	2021	Best Female Artist in Western Africa	Herself	Nominated	
All Africa Music Awards	2021	Breakout Artist of the Year	Herself	Nominated	
All Africa Music Awards	2021	Best African Collaboration	"Essence" (Wizkid feat. Tems)	Won	
All Africa Music Awards	2021	Song of the Year	"Essence" (Wizkid feat. Tems)	Won	
All Africa Music Awards	2021	Best Artist, Duo or Group in African R&B/Soul	"Essence" (Wizkid feat. Tems)	Nominated	
All Africa Music Awards	2021	Best Artist, Duo or Group in African R&B/Soul	"Damages"	Nominated	
All Africa Music Awards	2022	Best Female Artiste in West Africa	Herself	Nominated	
All Africa Music Awards	2022	Best Soundtrack in a Movie/Series/Documentary Film	"No Woman No Cry"	Won	
American Music Awards	2022	Favorite Afrobeats Artist	Herself	Nominated	
American Music Awards	2022	Collaboration of the Year	"Wait for U" (Future, Drake & Tems)	Nominated	
American Music Awards	2022	Favorite Hip-Hop Song	"Wait for U" (Future, Drake & Tems)	Won	
American Music Awards	2022	Favorite R&B Song	"Essence" (Wizkid feat. Tems)	Won	
American Music Awards	2025	Favorite Afrobeats Artist	Herself	Nominated	
BET Awards	2021	Best New International Act	Herself	Nominated	
BET Awards	2022	Best New Artist	Herself	Nominated	
BET Awards	2022	Best International Act	Herself	Won	
BET Awards	2022	Best Collaboration	"Essence" (Wizkid feat. Tems)	Won	
BET Awards	2023	Best Female R&B/Pop Artist	Herself	Nominated	
BET Awards	2023	Best Collaboration	"Wait for U" (Future feat. Drake & Tems)	Won	
BET Awards	2023	Viewer's Choice	"Wait for U" (Future feat. Drake & Tems)	Nominated	
BET Awards	2024	Video Director of the Year	Herself	Nominated	
BET Awards	2024	Best Gospel/Inspirational Award	"Me & U"	Won	
BET Awards	2025	BET Her Award	"Burning"	Nominated	
BET Awards	2025	BET Her Award	"Hold On"	Nominated	
BET Awards	2026	BET Her Award	"First"	Nominated	
BET Awards	2026	Best Female R&B/Pop Artist	Herself	Nominated	
BET Awards	2026	Viewer's Choice Award	"Raindance"	Nominated	
BET Hip Hop Awards	2022	Song of the Year	"Wait for U" (Future, Drake & Tems)	Nominated	
BET Hip Hop Awards	2022	Best Collaboration	"Wait for U" (Future, Drake & Tems)	Won	
BET Hip Hop Awards	2022	Best Hip Hop Video	"Wait for U" (Future, Drake & Tems)	Nominated	
Black Reel Awards	2023	Outstanding Original Song	"Lift Me Up" (as songwriter)	Won	
BMI London Awards	2022	Herself	Impact Award	Won	
BMI London Awards	2022	"Essence" (Wizkid feat. Tems)	Most Performed Songs	Won	
BMI London Awards	2022	"Essence (Remix)" (Wizkid feat. Tems & Justin Bieber)	Most Performed Songs	Won	
City People Music Award	2020	Next Rated Artiste (Female)	Herself	Nominated	
Critics' Choice Awards	2023	Best Song	"Lift Me Up" (as songwriter)	Nominated	
Georgia Film Critics Association	2023	Best Original Song	"Lift Me Up" (as songwriter)	Nominated	
Golden Globe Awards	2023	Best Original Song	"Lift Me Up" (as songwriter)	Nominated	
Grammy Awards	2022	Best Global Music Performance	"Essence" (Wizkid feat. Tems)	Nominated	
Grammy Awards	2023	Album of the Year	Renaissance (As a featured artist)	Nominated	
Grammy Awards	2023	Best Rap Song	"Wait for U" (Future, Drake & Tems)	Nominated	
Grammy Awards	2023	Best Melodic Rap Performance	"Wait for U" (Future, Drake & Tems)	Won	
Grammy Awards	2024	Best Song Written for Visual Media	"Lift Me Up" (as songwriter)	Nominated	
Grammy Awards	2025	Best R&B Song	"Burning"	Nominated	
Grammy Awards	2025	Best Global Music Album	Born in the Wild	Nominated	
Grammy Awards	2025	Best African Music Performance	"Love Me JeJe"	Won	
Grammy Awards	2027	Best African Music Performance	"Big Daddy"	Pending	
Grammy Awards	2027	Best Global Music Album	" Love Is a Kingdom "	Pending	
Grammy Awards	2027	Best R&B Song	"What You Need"	Pending	
Grammy Awards	2027	Best R&B Solo Performance	"What You Need"	Pending	
Guild of Music Supervisors Awards	2023	Best Song Written and/or Recording Created for a Film	"Lift Me Up" (as songwriter)	Nominated	
Hollywood Critics Association Creative Arts Awards	2023	Best Original Song	"Lift Me Up" (as songwriter)	Nominated	
Hollywood Music in Media Awards	2022	Best Original Song in a Feature Film	"Lift Me Up" (as songwriter)	Won	
Hollywood Music in Media Awards	2022	Song/Score – Trailer	"No Woman, No Cry"	Nominated	
Houston Film Critics Society Awards	2023	Best Original Song	"Lift Me Up" (as songwriter)	Nominated	
IHeart Radio Music Awards	2023	R&B Song of the Year	"Free Mind"	Nominated	
IHeart Radio Music Awards	2023	Best New R&B Artist	Herself	Nominated	
IHeart Radio Music Awards	2023	Afrobeats Artist of the Year	Herself	Won	
IHeart Radio Music Awards	2023	Best Collaboration	"Wait for U"(Future, Drake & Tems)	Nominated	
IHeart Radio Music Awards	2023	Hip-Hop Song of the Year	"Wait for U"(Future, Drake & Tems)	Won	
IHeart Radio Music Awards	2024	Afrobeats Artist of the Year	Herself	Nominated	
IHeart Radio Music Awards	2025	World Artist of the Year	Herself	Nominated	
iHeartRadio Titanium Award	2023	1 Billion Total Audience Spins on iHeartRadio Stations	"Essence" ft Tems (Wizkid)	Won	
MOBO Awards	2021	Best African Music Act	Herself	Nominated	
MOBO Awards	2022	Best African Music Act	Herself	Nominated	
MOBO Awards	2022	Best International Act	Herself	Nominated	
MOBO Awards	2025	Best African Music Act	Herself	Nominated	
MOBO Awards	2025	Best International Act	Herself	Nominated	
MTV Africa Music Award	2021	Best Breakthrough Act	Herself	Nominated	
MTV Europe Music Awards	2021	Best African Act	Herself	Nominated	
MTV Europe Music Awards	2022	Best New Act	Herself	Nominated	
MTV Europe Music Awards	2022	Best African Act	Herself	Nominated	
MTV Europe Music Awards	2024	Best Afrobeats	Herself	Nominated	
MTV Video Music Awards	2022	Best Hip Hop	"Wait for U" (Future, Drake & Tems)	Nominated	
MTV Video Music Awards	2022	Song of Summer	"Wait for U" (Future, Drake & Tems)	Nominated	
MTV Video Music Awards	2024	Best Afrobeats	"Love Me JeJe"	Nominated	
MTV Video Music Awards	2025	Best Afrobeats	"Get It Right"(Tems ft Asake)	Nominated	
MTV Video Music Awards	2026	Best R&B	"Raindance" (Dave and Tems)	Nominated	
NAACP Image Awards	2022	Outstanding New Artist	Herself	Nominated	
NAACP Image Awards	2022	Outstanding Music Video/Visual Album	"Essence" (Wizkid feat. Tems)	Won	
NAACP Image Awards	2022	Outstanding International Song	"Essence" (Wizkid feat. Tems)	Won	
NAACP Image Awards	2023	Outstanding Hip Hop/Rap Song	"Wait for U" (Future, Drake & Tems)	Nominated	
NAACP Image Awards	2023	Outstanding Duo, Group or Collaboration (Contemporary)	"Wait for U" (Future, Drake & Tems)	Nominated	
NAACP Image Awards	2023	Outstanding Duo, Group or Collaboration (Contemporary)	"Move" (Beyoncé featuring Grace Jones & Tems)	Nominated	
NAACP Image Awards	2023	Outstanding International Song	"No Woman No Cry"	Won	
NAACP Image Awards	2024	Outstanding Female Artist	Herself	Nominated	
NAACP Image Awards	2024	Outstanding International Song	"Me & U"	Won	
NAACP Image Awards	2025	Outstanding International Song	"Love Me JeJe"	Nominated	
Net Honours	2021	Most Played Alternative Song	"Damages"	Won	
Net Honours	2022	Most Popular Musician - Female	Herself	Nominated	
Net Honours	2022	Most Searched Musician - Female	Herself	Nominated	
Nickelodeon Kids' Choice Awards	2022	Favorite Global Music Star	Herself	Nominated	
People's Choice Awards	2024	The R&B Artist of the Year	Herself	Nominated	
Satellite Awards	2023	Best Original Song	"Lift Me Up" (as songwriter)	Nominated	
Silver Clef Award	2022	International Award	Herself	Won	
Society of Composers & Lyricists Awards	2023	Outstanding Original Song for a Dramatic or Documentary Visual Media Production	"Lift Me Up" (as songwriter)	Nominated	
Soul Train Music Awards	2021	Best Collaboration	"Essence" (Wizkid feat. Tems)	Won	
Soul Train Music Awards	2021	Video of the Year	"Essence" (Wizkid feat. Tems)	Nominated	
Soul Train Music Awards	2021	Song of the Year	"Essence" (Wizkid feat. Tems)	Nominated	
Soul Train Music Awards	2021	The Ashford & Simpson Songwriter's Award	"Essence" (Wizkid feat. Tems)	Nominated	
Soul Train Music Awards	2021	Best New Artist	Herself	Nominated	
Soul Train Music Awards	2022	Best Collaboration	"Move" (Beyoncé featuring Grace Jones & Tems)	Nominated	
Soul Train Music Awards	2022	Best R&B/Soul Female Artist	Herself	Nominated	
Soul Train Music Awards	2022	Best New Artist	Herself	Won	
Soul Train Music Awards	2026	R&B/Soul Song of The Year	"What You Need"	Pending	
Soul Train Music Awards	2026	Spotify's RNB X International Artist	Herself	Pending	
The Beatz Awards	2021	Songwriter of the Year	Herself for "Damages"	Nominated	
The Future Awards Africa	2020	Prize for Music	Herself	Nominated	
The Future Awards Africa	2022	Prize for Music	Herself	Won	
The Headies	2019	Best Vocal Performance (Female)	"Mr Rebel"	Nominated	
The Headies	2019	Best Alternative Song	"Mr Rebel"	Nominated	
The Headies	2020	Next Rated	Herself	Nominated	
The Headies	2022	Song of the Year	"Essence" (Wizkid feat. Tems)	Won	
The Headies	2022	Best Recording of the Year	"Essence" (Wizkid feat. Tems)	Nominated	
The Headies	2022	Best R&B Single	"Essence" (Wizkid feat. Tems)	Won	
The Headies	2022	Best Collaboration	"Essence" (Wizkid feat. Tems)	Won	
The Headies	2022	Best Vocal Performance (Female)	"Essence" (Wizkid feat. Tems)	Nominated	
The Headies	2022	Headies’ Viewer's Choice	"Essence" (Wizkid feat. Tems)	Nominated	
The Headies	2022	Best R&B Album	If Orange Was a Place	Won	
The Headies	2022	Best Female Artiste	Herself	Won	
The Headies	2022	Song of the Year	"No Woman No Cry"	Nominated	
The Headies	2022	Songwriter of the Year	"Lift Me Up"	Nominated	
The Headies	2022	Best Female Artiste	Herself	Nominated	
The Headies	2023	Best Recording of the Year	"No Woman No Cry"	Nominated	
The Headies	2023	Best Female Artist	Herself	Nominated	
The Headies	2024	Best Recording of the Year	"Burning"	Won	
The Headies	2024	Best R&B Single	"Burning"	Nominated	
The Headies	2024	Headies Viewers' Choice Award	"Love Me JeJe"	Nominated	
The Headies	2024	Album of the Year	Born in the Wild	Nominated	
The Headies	2024	Digital Artiste of the Year	Herself	Nominated	
The Headies	2024	Artiste of the Year	Herself	Nominated	
2027	2024	Best Female Ariste	Herself	Pending	
2027	2024	Best R&B Single	What You Need	Pending	
2027	2024	Best R&B Album	Love Is a Kingdom	Pending	
3Music Awards	2022	African Song of the Year	"Essence (remix)" (featuring Tems and Justin Bieber)	Won	
South African Music Awards	2022	Rest of Africa	Herself	Won	
South African Music Awards	2025	Rest of Africa	Born In The Wild	Nominated	
