= 2023 iHeartRadio Music Awards =

Annual US music awards ceremony

- Date: March 27, 2023
- Location: Dolby Theatre, Los Angeles
- Country: United States
- Hosted by: Lenny Kravitz
- Most awards: Taylor Swift (6)
- Most nominations: Taylor Swift; Harry Styles (8 each)
- Website: news.iheart.com/awards

Television/radio coverage
- Network: Fox

The 2023 iHeartRadio Music Awards were held at the Dolby Theatre in Los Angeles on March 27, 2023, and broadcast live on Fox. The event was hosted by singer-songwriter and actor Lenny Kravitz.

During the ceremony Pink was honored with the Icon Award for her "impact on pop culture, longevity and continued relevance through new music, touring and radio force". Taylor Swift was recognized with the Innovator Award for being "an advocate for women’s rights and the LGBTQ+ community, using her music and platform to inspire young people to use their voting power".

== Performances ==
Performers were announced on March 7, 2023.

Performers at the 2023 iHeartRadio Music Awards
Performer(s)	Song(s)
P!nk	"Trustfall"
Pat Benatar Neil Giraldo Kelly Clarkson P!nk	Tribute to P!nk "Just Like A Pill" "Just Give Me a Reason" "What About Us" "Who Knew" "All I Know So Far"
Coldplay	"My Universe"^{[a]}
Cody Johnson	"'Till You Can't"
Jax	"Victoria's Secret"
Lenny Kravitz	"American Woman" "Fly Away" "Are You Gonna Go My Way"
Latto	"Big Energy" "Lottery"
Muni Long	"Hrs and Hrs"
Keith Urban	"Brown Eyes Baby" "Somewhere In My Car"
Giovannie and the Hired Guns	"Ramon Ayala"

Notes

- ^{^[a]} Pre-recorded from the Music of the Spheres World Tour at Estádio do Morumbi in São Paulo, Brazil

== Winners and nominees ==
iHeartRadio announced the nominees on January 11, 2023. Harry Styles and Taylor Swift were the most nominated artists, with eight nominations each. Drake, Dua Lipa and Jack Harlow received six nominations apiece, while Beyoncé and Doja Cat tied with five.

Winners are listed first and in bold.

Song of the Year	Artist of the Year
**"Anti-Hero" – Taylor Swift**; "About Damn Time" – Lizzo; "As It Was" – Harry Styles; "Big Energy" – Latto; "Enemy (from the series Arcane League of Legends)" – Imagine Dragons & JID; "First Class" – Jack Harlow; "Ghost" – Justin Bieber; "Heat Waves" – Glass Animals; "Industry Baby" – Lil Nas X & Jack Harlow; "Woman" – Doja Cat	**Harry Styles**; Beyoncé; Doja Cat; Drake; Dua Lipa; Jack Harlow; Justin Bieber; Lizzo; Taylor Swift; The Weeknd
Best Duo/Group of the Year	Best Collaboration
**Imagine Dragons**; AJR; Black Eyed Peas; Blackpink; Silk Sonic (Bruno Mars & Anderson .Paak); Glass Animals; Måneskin; OneRepublic; Parmalee; Red Hot Chili Peppers	**"Unholy" – Sam Smith & Kim Petras**; "Drunk (And I Don't Wanna Go Home)" – Elle King & Miranda Lambert; "Cold Heart (Pnau remix)" – Elton John & Dua Lipa; "Half of My Hometown" – Kelsea Ballerini featuring Kenny Chesney; "I Like You (A Happier Song)" – Post Malone featuring Doja Cat; "Industry Baby" – Lil Nas X & Jack Harlow; "One Right Now" – Post Malone & The Weeknd; "Sweetest Pie" – Megan Thee Stallion & Dua Lipa; "Wait for U" – Future featuring Drake & Tems; "You Right" – Doja Cat featuring The Weeknd
Best New Pop Artist	Country Song of the Year
**Jax**; Dove Cameron; Gayle; Nicky Youre; Steve Lacy	**"She Had Me at Heads Carolina" – Cole Swindell**; "Buy Dirt" – Jordan Davis featuring Luke Bryan; "Half of My Hometown" – Kelsea Ballerini featuring Kenny Chesney; "The Kind of Love We Make" – Luke Combs; "Wasted On You" – Morgan Wallen
Country Artist of the Year	Best New Country Artist
**Morgan Wallen**; Carrie Underwood; Jason Aldean; Kane Brown; Luke Combs	**Cody Johnson**; Bailey Zimmerman; Elle King; Elvie Shane; Priscilla Block
Afrobeats Artist of the Year	Hip-Hop Song of the Year
**Tems**; **Wizkid**; Burna Boy; CKay; Fireboy DML	**"Wait for U" – Future featuring Drake & Tems**; "F.N.F. (Let's Go)" – Hitkidd & GloRilla; "First Class" – Jack Harlow; "Girls Want Girls" – Drake featuring Lil Baby; "Super Gremlin" – Kodak Black
Hip-Hop Artist of the Year	Best New Hip-Hop Artist
**Drake**; Future; Kodak Black; Lil Baby; Moneybagg Yo	**GloRilla**; **Latto**; B-Lovee; Nardo Wick; SleazyWorld Go
R&B Song of the Year	R&B Artist of the Year
**"I Hate U" – SZA**; "Break My Soul" – Beyoncé; "Free Mind" – Tems; "Hrs and Hrs" – Muni Long; "Smokin out the Window" – Silk Sonic (Bruno Mars & Anderson .Paak)	**SZA**; Blxst; Silk Sonic (Bruno Mars & Anderson .Paak); Muni Long; Yung Bleu
Best New R&B Artist	Alternative Song of the Year
**Muni Long**; Blxst; Brent Faiyaz; Steve Lacy; Tems	**"Enemy (from the series Arcane League of Legends)" – Imagine Dragons & JID**; "Black Summer" – Red Hot Chili Peppers; "Edging" – Blink-182; "Heat Waves" – Glass Animals; "Running Up That Hill (A Deal With God)" – Kate Bush
Alternative Artist of the Year	Best New Artist (Alternative & Rock)
**Red Hot Chili Peppers**; Imagine Dragons; Måneskin; Twenty One Pilots; Weezer	**Giovannie and the Hired Guns**; Beach Weather; BoyWithUke; Turnstile; Wet Leg
Rock Song of the Year	Rock Artist of the Year
**"Black Summer" – Red Hot Chili Peppers**; "Patient Number 9" – Ozzy Osbourne featuring Jeff Beck; "Planet Zero" – Shinedown; "So Called Life" – Three Days Grace; "Taking Me Back" – Jack White	**Papa Roach**; Ghost; Red Hot Chili Peppers; Shinedown; Three Days Grace
Dance Song of the Year	Dance Artist of the Year
**"I'm Good (Blue)" – David Guetta & Bebe Rexha**; "Cold Heart (Pnau remix)" – Elton John & Dua Lipa; "Escape" – KX5, Kaskade, Deadmau5 featuring Hayla; "Heaven Takes You Home" – Swedish House Mafia & Connie Constance; "Hot In It" – Tiësto & Charli XCX	**Anabel Englund**; Joel Corry; Sofi Tukker; Swedish House Mafia; Tiësto
Latin Pop/Reggaeton Song of the Year	Latin Pop/Reggaeton Artist of the Year
**"Mamiii" – Becky G & Karol G**; "El Incomprendido" – Farruko, Víctor Cárdenas & DJ Adoni; "Me Porto Bonito" – Bad Bunny featuring Chencho Corleone; "Moscow Mule" – Bad Bunny; "Provenza" – Karol G	**Bad Bunny**; Daddy Yankee; Farruko; Karol G; Rauw Alejandro
Regional Mexican Song of the Year	Regional Mexican Artist of the Year
**"Cómo Te Olvido" – La Arrolladora Banda El Limón de René Camacho**; "Cada Quien" – Grupo Firme featuring Maluma; "Si Te Pudiera Mentir" – Calibre 50; "Ya Solo Eres Mi Ex" – La Adictiva; "Ya Supérame" – Grupo Firme	**Grupo Firme**; Calibre 50; Christian Nodal; El Fantasma; La Adictiva
Best New Latin Artist	Best Lyrics
**Kali Uchis**; Blessd; Quevedo; Ryan Castro; Venesti	**"Anti-Hero" – Taylor Swift**; "About Damn Time" – Lizzo; "ABCDEFU" – Gayle; "Buy Dirt" – Jordan Davis featuring Luke Bryan; "Glimpse of Us" – Joji; "Lift Me Up" – Rihanna; "N95" – Kendrick Lamar; "Pushin P" – Gunna & Future featuring Young Thug; "Super Freaky Girl" – Nicki Minaj; "Wasted on You" – Morgan Wallen; "We Don't Talk About Bruno" – Lin-Manuel Miranda performed by the cast of Encanto
Best Music Video	Best Fan Army
**"Yet To Come" – BTS**; "Anti-Hero" – Taylor Swift; "As It Was" – Harry Styles; "Calm Down" – Rema & Selena Gomez; "Don't Be Shy" – Tiësto & Karol G; "Don't You Worry" – Black Eyed Peas, Shakira & David Guetta; "Envolver" – Anitta; "Left and Right" – Charlie Puth featuring Jungkook of BTS; "Pink Venom" – Blackpink; "Tití Me Preguntó" – Bad Bunny	**BTSArmy – BTS**; Barbz – Nicki Minaj; Beliebers – Justin Bieber; Beyhive – Beyoncé; Blinks – Blackpink; Harries – Harry Styles; Hotties – Megan Thee Stallion; Louies – Louis Tomlinson; RihannaNavy – Rihanna; Rushers – Big Time Rush; Selenators – Selena Gomez; Swifties – Taylor Swift
Social Star Award	Favorite Tour Photographer
**Jvke**; Bailey Zimmerman; Charli D'Amelio; Em Beihold; Gayle; GloRilla; Lauren Spencer-Smith; Yung Gravy	**Harry Styles – Lloyd Wakefield**; Bad Bunny – SIEMPRERIC; Demi Lovato – Angelo Kritikos; Dua Lipa – Elizabeth Miranda; Halsey – Yasi; Louis Tomlinson – Joshua Halling; Luke Combs – David Bergman; Machine Gun Kelly – Sam Cahill; Olivia Rodrigo – DONSLENS; Post Malone – Adam DeGross; Twenty One Pilots - Ashley Osborn; Yungblud – Tom Pallant
TikTok Bop of the Year	Favorite Documentary
**"Bejeweled" – Taylor Swift**; "About Damn Time" – Lizzo; "As It Was" – Harry Styles; "Bad Habit" – Steve Lacy; "Big Energy" – Latto; "Cuff It" – Beyoncé; "Envolver" – Anitta; "Just Wanna Rock" – Lil Uzi Vert; "Made You Look" – Meghan Trainor; "Super Freaky Girl" – Nicki Minaj; "Unholy" – Sam Smith & Kim Petras; "World's Smallest Violin" – AJR	**Selena Gomez: My Mind & Me – Selena Gomez**; Halftime – Jennifer Lopez; Life in Pink – Machine Gun Kelly; Love, Lizzo – Lizzo; Niall Horan's Homecoming: The Road to Mullingar with Lewis Capaldi – Niall Horan & Lewis Capaldi; Shania Twain: Not Just a Girl – Shania Twain; Sheryl – Sheryl Crow; Untrapped: The Story of Lil Baby – Lil Baby
Favorite Tour Style	Favorite Residency
**Harry Styles**; Bad Bunny; Carrie Underwood; Dua Lipa; Elton John; Lady Gaga; Lil Nas X; Lizzo; Machine Gun Kelly; Olivia Rodrigo; Rosalía; The Weeknd	**Love On Tour – Harry Styles**; An Evening with Silk Sonic – Silk Sonic (Bruno Mars & Anderson .Paak); Enigma + Jazz & Piano – Lady Gaga; Let's Go! – Shania Twain; Love in Las Vegas – John Legend; Play – Katy Perry; Reflection: The Las Vegas Residency – Carrie Underwood; My Way: The Las Vegas Residency - Usher; Weekends with Adele – Adele
Favorite Use of a Sample	Album of the Year (per genre)
**Taylor Swift's "Question...?" – sampled Taylor Swift's "Out of the Woods"**; Beyoncé's "Summer Renaissance" – sampled Donna Summer's "I Feel Love"; Blackpink's "Pink Venom" – sampled 50 Cent's "P.I.M.P.", Rihanna's "Pon de Replay", and Biggie's "Kick in the Door"; Chlöe's "Treat Me" – sampled Bubba Sparxxx & Ying Yang Twins' "Ms. New Booty"; David Guetta & Bebe Rexha's "I'm Good (Blue)" – sampled Eiffel 65's "Blue (Da Ba Dee)"; DJ Khaled & Drake's "Staying Alive" – sampled The Bee Gees' "Stayin' Alive"; Doja Cat's "Vegas" – sampled Shonka Dukureh's "Hound Dog"; Jack Harlow's "First Class" – sampled Fergie's "Glamorous"; Latto's "Big Energy" – sampled Mariah Carey's "Fantasy"; Lizzo's "Break Up Twice" – sampled Lauryn Hill's "Doo Wop (That Thing)"; Nicki Minaj's "Super Freaky Girl" – sampled Rick James' "Super Freak"; Yung Gravy's "Betty (Get Money)" – sampled Rick Astley's "Never Gonna Give You Up"	Alternative: **Unlimited Love – Red Hot Chili Peppers**; Country: **Growin' Up – Luke Combs**; Hip-Hop: **Her Loss – Drake & 21 Savage**; Latin: **Un Verano Sin Ti – Bad Bunny**; Pop: **Midnights – Taylor Swift**; R&B: **Renaissance – Beyoncé**; Rock: **Impera – Ghost**
Tour of the Year	iHeartRadio Innovator
**Music of the Spheres World Tour – Coldplay**	**Taylor Swift**
iHeartRadio Icon Award	iHeartRadio Most Played Titanium Award
**P!nk**	**Doja Cat**
