= IHeartRadio Music Award for Best Collaboration =

Category in iHeartRadio Music Awards

iHeartRadio Music Award for Best Collaboration
- Country: United States
- Presented by: iHeartRadio
- First award: 2014
- Currently held by: Rosé and Bruno Mars – "APT." (2026)

Highlights
- Most awards: Bruno Mars (4)
- Most nominations: Justin Bieber (6)

The iHeartRadio Music Award for Best Collaboration is one of the awards handed out at the yearly iHeartRadio Music Awards. It was first awarded in 2014 and presented to Pitbull and Kesha for their song "Timber". Bruno Mars is the most awarded artist in this category with four wins. Justin Bieber is the most nominated artist with six nominations.

== Recipients ==
Year	Winner(s)	Work	Nominees	Ref.
2014	Pitbull featuring Kesha	"Timber"	"Holy Grail" – Jay-Z featuring Justin Timberlake; "Stay" – Rihanna featuring Mikky Ekko; "Suit & Tie" – Justin Timberlake featuring Jay-Z; "The Monster" – Eminem featuring Rihanna	
2015	Jessie J, Ariana Grande and Nicki Minaj	"Bang Bang"	"Dark Horse" – Katy Perry featuring Juicy J; "Fancy" – Iggy Azalea featuring Charli XCX; "Problem" – Ariana Grande featuring Iggy Azalea; "Talk Dirty" – Jason Derulo featuring 2 Chainz	
2016	Mark Ronson featuring Bruno Mars	"Uptown Funk"	"Bad Blood" – Taylor Swift featuring Kendrick Lamar; "Like I'm Gonna Lose You" – Meghan Trainor featuring John Legend; "See You Again" – Wiz Khalifa featuring Charlie Puth; "Where Are Ü Now" – Skrillex and Diplo with Justin Bieber	
2017	Rihanna featuring Drake	"Work"	"Cheap Thrills" – Sia featuring Sean Paul; "Closer" – The Chainsmokers featuring Halsey; "Don't Let Me Down" – The Chainsmokers featuring Daya; "This Is What You Came For" – Calvin Harris featuring Rihanna	
2018	The Chainsmokers and Coldplay	"Something Just Like This"	"Despacito" – Luis Fonsi and Daddy Yankee featuring Justin Bieber; "Don't Wanna Know" – Maroon 5 featuring Kendrick Lamar; "Stay" – Zedd and Alessia Cara; "Wild Thoughts" – DJ Khaled featuring Rihanna and Bryson Tiller	
2019	Bruno Mars featuring Cardi B	"Finesse"	"Meant to Be" – Bebe Rexha and Florida Georgia Line; "I Like It" – Cardi B, Bad Bunny and J Balvin; "Girls Like You" – Maroon 5 featuring Cardi B; "The Middle" – Zedd, Maren Morris and Grey	
2020	Shawn Mendes and Camila Cabello	"Señorita"	"Dancing with a Stranger" – Sam Smith and Normani; "Eastside" – Benny Blanco, Halsey and Khalid; "I Don't Care" – Ed Sheeran and Justin Bieber; "Sunflower" – Post Malone and Swae Lee	
2021	Megan Thee Stallion featuring Beyoncé	"Savage"	"Go Crazy" - Chris Brown and Young Thug; "Holy" - Justin Bieber featuring Chance the Rapper; "I Hope" - Gabby Barrett featuring Charlie Puth; "Mood" - 24kGoldn featuring Iann Dior	
2022	The Kid Laroi and Justin Bieber	"Stay"	"Best Friend" – Saweetie featuring Doja Cat; "If I Didn't Love You" – Jason Aldean and Carrie Underwood; "Kiss Me More" – Doja Cat featuring SZA; "Peaches" – Justin Bieber featuring Daniel Caesar and Giveon	
2023	Sam Smith and Kim Petras	"Unholy"	"Drunk (And I Don't Wanna Go Home)" – Elle King and Miranda Lambert; "Cold Heart (Pnau remix)" – Elton John and Dua Lipa; "Half of My Hometown" – Kelsea Ballerini featuring Kenny Chesney; "I Like You (A Happier Song)" – Post Malone featuring Doja Cat; "Industry Baby" – Lil Nas X and Jack Harlow; "One Right Now" – Post Malone and the Weeknd; "Sweetest Pie" – Megan Thee Stallion and Dua Lipa; "Wait for U" – Future featuring Drake and Tems; "You Right" – Doja Cat featuring the Weeknd	
2024	Rema and Selena Gomez	"Calm Down"	"All My Life" – Lil Durk featuring J. Cole; "Barbie World" – Nicki Minaj and Ice Spice featuring Aqua; "Boy's a Liar, Pt. 2" – PinkPantheress and Ice Spice; "Creepin'" – Metro Boomin featuring the Weeknd and 21 Savage; "Good Good" – Usher, Summer Walker and 21 Savage; "Rich Flex" – Drake and 21 Savage; "Thank God" – Kane Brown and Katelyn Brown; "Tomorrow 2" – GloRilla featuring Cardi B; "TQG" – Karol G and Shakira	
2025	Lady Gaga and Bruno Mars	"Die with a Smile"	"Fortnight" – Taylor Swift featuring Post Malone; "I Had Some Help" – Post Malone featuring Morgan Wallen; "Like That" – Future, Metro Boomin and Kendrick Lamar; "Miles on It" – Kane Brown and Marshmello	
2026	Rosé and Bruno Mars	"APT."	"All the Way" – BigXthaPlug featuring Bailey Zimmerman; "Luther" – Kendrick Lamar and SZA; "Timeless" – The Weeknd featuring Playboi Carti; "Whatchu Kno About Me" – GloRilla featuring Sexyy Red	

== Statistics ==
=== Artists with multiple wins ===
4 wins

- Bruno Mars

=== Artists with multiple nominations ===
6 nominations

- Justin Bieber

5 nominations

- Rihanna
- Post Malone

4 nominations

- Bruno Mars
- Cardi B
- Doja Cat
- The Weeknd

3 nominations

- Drake
- The Chainsmokers
- 21 Savage

2 nominations

- Jay-Z
- Justin Timberlake
- Ariana Grande
- Nicki Minaj
- Iggy Azalea
- Taylor Swift
- Charlie Puth
- Halsey
- Maroon 5
- Zedd
- Sam Smith
- Megan Thee Stallion
- SZA
- Dua Lipa
- Future
- Ice Spice
- Metro Boomin
- Kane Brown
- GloRilla
- Kendrick Lamar
