= Lift Me Up (Rihanna song) =

- Original single cover. Two alternative digital single covers for "Lift Me Up" were also released.

Single by Rihanna

from the album Black Panther: Wakanda Forever
- Released: October 28, 2022
- Studio: Westlake Recording Studios (Hollywood, CA)
- Genre: R&B
- Length: 3:16
- Label: Westbury Road; Roc Nation; Def Jam; Hollywood
- Composers: Ludwig Göransson; Robyn Rihanna Fenty; Ryan Coogler
- Lyricists: Coogler; Temilade Openiyi
- Producer: Ludwig Göransson

Rihanna singles chronology
"Believe It" (2020)	"Lift Me Up" (2022)	"Friend of Mine" (2025)

Music video
- "Lift Me Up" on YouTube

"Lift Me Up" is a song recorded by the Barbadian singer Rihanna. It was released on October 28, 2022, by Westbury Road, Roc Nation, Def Jam, and Hollywood Records, as the lead single from the soundtrack album of the 2022 superhero film Black Panther: Wakanda Forever. The song marked Rihanna's first solo music output in six years, following her eighth studio album, Anti (2016). An R&B ballad, "Lift Me Up" was written by Rihanna, Nigerian singer Tems, and Ryan Coogler, and produced by Ludwig Göransson.

Music critics were divided on the song; some praised Rihanna's vocals, while others were critical of the song's saccharine lyrics and generic production. It received various film awards nominations, including Best Original Song at the 95th Academy Awards and Best Original Song at the 80th Golden Globe Awards. The song has also won various awards, including Best Original Song in a Feature Film at the 13th Hollywood Music in Media Awards and Best Song at the 2023 African-American Film Critics Association.

"Lift Me Up" reached number one in Belgium, Hungary, Switzerland, and South Africa, number two on the US Billboard Hot 100 chart, top five in Australia, the United Kingdom, France and the top ten in various other countries. It was certified diamond by the Syndicat National de l'Édition Phonographique (SNEP), platinum by Music Canada and the Recording Industry Association of America (RIAA), and gold by the British Phonographic Industry (BPI). American cinematographer Autumn Durald Arkapaw directed the music video, which sees Rihanna on an empty beach interspersed with short scenes from the film. Rihanna performed "Lift Me Up" for the first time at the 95th Academy Awards.

== Background ==
In 2017, Rihanna took an extended hiatus from music after the release of her eighth studio album Anti (2016) and several collaborations, including "Wild Thoughts" with DJ Khaled, "Lemon" with N.E.R.D., "Loyalty" with Kendrick Lamar, and her latest collaboration, "Believe It", with PartyNextDoor. Following the birth of the singer's first child on May 13, 2022, Rihanna said she was working on new music.

In October 2022, it was reported that the singer had recorded two songs for the soundtrack to the upcoming sequel to the Marvel Studios 2018 film Black Panther (2018), titled Black Panther: Wakanda Forever (2022). On October 26, Rihanna announced the song which became her first solo single release since "Love on the Brain" (2016). In addition to "Lift Me Up", Rihanna recorded the track "Born Again".

== Composition ==
According to Clash, "Lift Me Up" is an "emotive" R&B ballad that "speaks from the heart". Produced by Swedish composer Ludwig Göransson, who composed the movie's score, the song acts as a tribute to the late Chadwick Boseman, who played T'Challa, the titular protagonist in Black Panther; Boseman died on August 28, 2020. The song was written by Rihanna, Göransson, Ryan Coogler and Tems. The latter spoke about the meaning and creative process of the song:

After speaking with Ryan and hearing his direction for the film and the song, I wanted to write something that portrays a warm embrace from all the people that I've lost in my life. I tried to imagine what it would feel like if I could sing to them now and express how much I miss them. Rihanna has been an inspiration to me so hearing her convey this song is a great honor.

— Tems

The song is performed in the key of A major with a tempo of 89 beats per minute in common time. It follows a chord progression of A–Bm–E, and Rihanna's vocals span from G♯_{3} to E_{5} in the song.

== Critical reception ==
Spencer Kornhaber of The Atlantic described the song as "gorgeous" and stated that it "is built around her vocals and reasserts her ownership of her now-ubiquitous sound." Harper's Bazaar's Bianca Betancourt thought Rihanna might earn her first nomination of Best Original Song at the Academy Awards for "Lift Me Up". Dylan Green of Pitchfork described the singer's voice as "matured, with a burnished, mahogany sheen" capable of keeping "the ballad afloat, selling every crescendo and note of anguish", however also described it as a "generic entry for the Black Panther: Wakanda Forever soundtrack". The Guardian's Shaad D'Souza was not particularly impressed with the song's lyrical content, writing that it is "light and frankly anonymous, a far cry from Anti's bright, world-weary, highly emotional lyrics" believing that it is not Rihanna's true comeback record. However, the journalist appreciated the production and sounds, describing them as "a soft, swaying ballad built around a lovely arpeggiating harp and serene strings", although "there is little of the heft and power of Tems songs such as 'Free Mind' or 'Damages'." Ed Potton of The Times rated the track 2 stars out of five, and wrote that even though it is "flawlessly sung over subtle strings by Rihanna", it is "forgettable" and "bland", adding that it "sounds like the result of a committee meeting — well meant, inoffensive, entirely devoid of individuality."

== Accolades ==
Awards and nominations
Year	Organization	Category	Result	Ref.
2022	Hollywood Music in Media Awards	Best Original Song in a Feature Film	Won	
2023	Academy Awards	Best Original Song	Nominated	
2023	African-American Film Critics Association Awards	Best Song	Won	
2023	Black Reel Awards	Outstanding Original Song	Won	
2023	BET Awards	BET Her Award	Nominated	
2023	Critics' Choice Movie Awards	Best Song	Nominated	
2023	Georgia Film Critics Association	Best Original Song	Nominated	
2023	Golden Globes Awards	Best Original Song	Nominated	
2023	Guild of Music Supervisors Awards	Best Song Written and/or Recording Created for a Film	Nominated	
2023	Hollywood Critics Association Awards	Best Original Song	Nominated	
2023	Houston Film Critics Society Awards	Best Original Song	Nominated	
2023	iHeartRadio Music Awards	Best Lyrics	Nominated	
2023	Kids' Choice Awards	Favorite Song	Nominated	
2023	MTV Movie & TV Awards	Best Song	Nominated	
2023	NAACP Image Awards	Outstanding Soul/R&B Song	Nominated	
2023	NAACP Image Awards	Outstanding Music Video	Won	
2023	Satellite Awards	Best Original Song	Nominated	
2023	Society of Composers & Lyricists	Outstanding Original Song for a Dramatic or Documentary Visual Media Production	Nominated	
2024	Grammy Awards	Best Song Written for Visual Media	Nominated	
2024	ASCAP Pop	Most Performed Pop Songs	Won	

== Commercial performance ==
In the United States, "Lift Me Up" debuted with nearly eight million streams, and 10,000 digital downloads on October 28, 2022, recording another 6.9 million streams and 6,000 digital downloads over the next two days, according to Luminate Data. The single ended up debuting at number two on the US Billboard Hot 100 chart, it garnered a 48.1 million radio audience, 26.2 million streams, and 23,000 digital downloads in its opening first week, and marked Rihanna's first top-10 entry since "Wild Thoughts" in 2017. "Lift Me Up" is Rihanna's 32nd top 10, as well as her highest debut, tied with the 2010 Eminem collaboration "Love the Way You Lie" which also entered the chart at number two. "Lift Me Up" further debuted at number three on the Digital Songs Sales chart—Rihanna's 36th top-ten song on the chart. Simultaneously, the song started at number six on the Radio Songs chart, becoming only the fourth top-ten debut since the chart's establishment in 1998. The single topped the Hot R&B/Hip-Hop Songs and Hot R&B Songs charts, marking Rihanna's eighth and sixth number-one songs on the charts, respectively.

In the United Kingdom, "Lift Me Up" debuted at number three on the Official Singles Chart, marking that week's highest entry on the chart. Simultaneously, it became Rihanna's first top-5 single in five years and her highest-placing solo single in the UK in a decade, following "Diamonds" (2012). Furthermore, it became Rihanna's 31st top-10 and 50th top-40 song in the UK. The song debuted at number three on the Irish Singles Chart as well. In Australia, "Lift Me Up" debuted at number five on the ARIA Singles Chart.

== Promotion ==
=== Music video ===
The song's music video was released on October 28, 2022, via Rihanna's official YouTube channel. The video is directed by Autumn Durald Arkapaw, the cinematographer of Black Panther: Wakanda Forever, and it depicts Rihanna on an empty beach interspersed with short scenes from the film.

=== Live performance ===
Rihanna performed "Lift Me Up" for the first time during the 95th Academy Awards on March 12, 2023. The performance featured a full band, string section, and backup vocalists, while Rihanna was standing on a central platform that elevated in the middle of the rendition. Lyndsey Havens of Billboard called the performance "soaring" and wrote, "'Lift Me Up' came to life as Rih sang with palpable passion to honor the late Chadwick Boseman." According to Julia MacCary of Variety, many people watching the performance in the audience or at home "were struck by the power and emotiveness of her live vocals." The New York Times' Nicole Sperling declared the performance alongside Lady Gaga's the "Best Pop Superstar Performance" of the night. She stated, "The soaring ballad benefited from the deft stage design, and Rihanna's vocals brought down the house."

== Credits and personnel ==
Credits adopted from Tidal.

- Robyn Fenty – vocal, lyricist, composer
- Temilade Openiyi – lyricist, composer, background vocalist
- Ryan Coogler – lyricist, composer
- Ludwig Göransson – producer, lyricist, composer, piano
- Mono Blanco – additional vocal
- Kuk Harrell – vocal producer
- Chris Gehringer – mastering engineer
- Manny Marroquin – mixer
- Marco Carriòn – recording engineer
- Marcos Tovar – recording engineer
- Osarumen "LMBSKN" Osamuyi – recording engineer
- Oamen "SirBastien" – recording engineer
- Irabor – recording engineer
- Frank Rodriguez – recording engineer
- Trey Pearce – assisting, recording engineer
- Robert N. Johnson – assisting, recording engineer
- Patrick Gardner – assisting, recording engineer
- Hayden Duncan – assisting, recording engineer
- Lou Carrao – assisting, recording engineer

== Charts ==
=== Weekly charts ===
Weekly chart performance
Chart (2022–2023)	Peak position
Australia (ARIA)	5
Austria (Ö3 Austria Top 40)	11
Belgium (Ultratop 50 Flanders)	13
Belgium (Ultratop 50 Wallonia)	1
Brazil (Billboard)	23
Canada Hot 100 (Billboard)	3
Canada AC (Billboard)	27
Canada CHR/Top 40 (Billboard)	19
Canada Hot AC (Billboard)	20
Croatia (HRT)	5
Croatia (Billboard)	5
Czech Republic Airplay (ČNS IFPI)	6
Czech Republic Singles Digital (ČNS IFPI)	24
Denmark (Tracklisten)	8
France (SNEP)	3
Germany (GfK)	9
Global 200 (Billboard)	3
Hungary (Single Top 40)	1
Hungary (Stream Top 40)	37
Iceland (Tónlistinn)	6
Ireland (IRMA)	3
Italy (FIMI)	33
Japan Hot Overseas (Billboard Japan)	2
Lebanon (Lebanese Top 20)	8
Lithuania (AGATA)	8
Malaysia (Billboard)	24
Malaysia International (RIM)	11
Netherlands (Dutch Top 40)	14
Netherlands (Single Top 100)	12
New Zealand (Recorded Music NZ)	3
Norway (VG-lista)	3
Portugal (AFP)	8
Romania (Billboard)	10
Singapore (RIAS)	18
Slovakia Airplay (ČNS IFPI)	16
Slovakia Singles Digital (ČNS IFPI)	4
South Africa (RISA)	1
South Korea BGM (Circle)	80
South Korea Download (Circle)	135
Spain (Promusicae)	32
Suriname (Nationale Top 40)	7
Sweden (Sverigetopplistan)	11
Switzerland (Schweizer Hitparade)	1
Turkey (Radiomonitor Türkiye)	2
UK Singles (Official Charts)	3
US Billboard Hot 100	2
US Adult Contemporary (Billboard)	9
US Adult Pop Airplay (Billboard)	14
US Dance Airplay (Billboard)	36
US Hot R&B/Hip-Hop Songs (Billboard)	1
US Pop Airplay (Billboard)	16
US R&B/Hip-Hop Airplay (Billboard)	5
US Rhythmic Airplay (Billboard)	6
Vietnam (Vietnam Hot 100)	18

=== Year-end charts ===
2022 year-end chart performance
Chart (2022)	Position
Belgium (Ultratop 50 Wallonia)	164
Hungary (Single Top 40)	26
Netherlands (Dutch Top 40)	87
Switzerland (Schweizer Hitparade)	80

2023 year-end chart performance
Chart (2023)	Position
Belgium (Ultratop 50 Wallonia)	24
Canada (Canadian Hot 100)	59
Global 200 (Billboard)	128
France (SNEP)	97
Switzerland (Schweizer Hitparade)	90
US Billboard Hot 100	63
US Adult Contemporary (Billboard)	26
US Hot R&B/Hip-Hop Songs (Billboard)	22
US Rhythmic (Billboard)	36

== Certifications ==
Certifications
Region	Certification	Certified units/sales
Australia (ARIA)	Platinum	70,000^{‡}
Belgium (BRMA)	Gold	20,000^{‡}
Canada (Music Canada)	2× Platinum	160,000^{‡}
Denmark (IFPI Danmark)	Gold	45,000^{‡}
France (SNEP)	Diamond	333,333^{‡}
Italy (FIMI)	Gold	50,000^{‡}
New Zealand (RMNZ)	Platinum	30,000^{‡}
Nigeria (TCSN)	Silver	25,000^{‡}
Poland (ZPAV)	Platinum	50,000^{‡}
Portugal (AFP)	Gold	5,000^{‡}
Spain (Promusicae)	Gold	30,000^{‡}
United Kingdom (BPI)	Gold	400,000^{‡}
United States (RIAA)	Platinum	1,000,000^{‡}
^{‡} Sales+streaming figures based on certification alone.

== Release history ==
Release history
Region	Date	Format(s)	Version(s)	Label(s)	Ref.
Various	October 28, 2022	Digital download; streaming	Original; instrumental	Westbury Road	
Italy	October 28, 2022	Radio airplay	Original	Universal	
United States	October 31, 2022	Adult contemporary radio; hot adult contemporary radio; modern adult contemporary radio	Original	Roc Nation; Def Jam	
United States	October 31, 2022	Triple A radio	Original	Roc Nation; Def Jam	
United States	November 1, 2022	Contemporary hit radio	Original	Roc Nation; Def Jam	
United States	November 1, 2022	Rhythmic contemporary radio	Original	Roc Nation; Def Jam	
United States	November 1, 2022	Urban adult contemporary radio; urban contemporary radio	Original	Roc Nation; Def Jam	
