= American Music Award for Collaboration of the Year =

American award for musical collaborations

American Music Awards for Collaboration of the Year
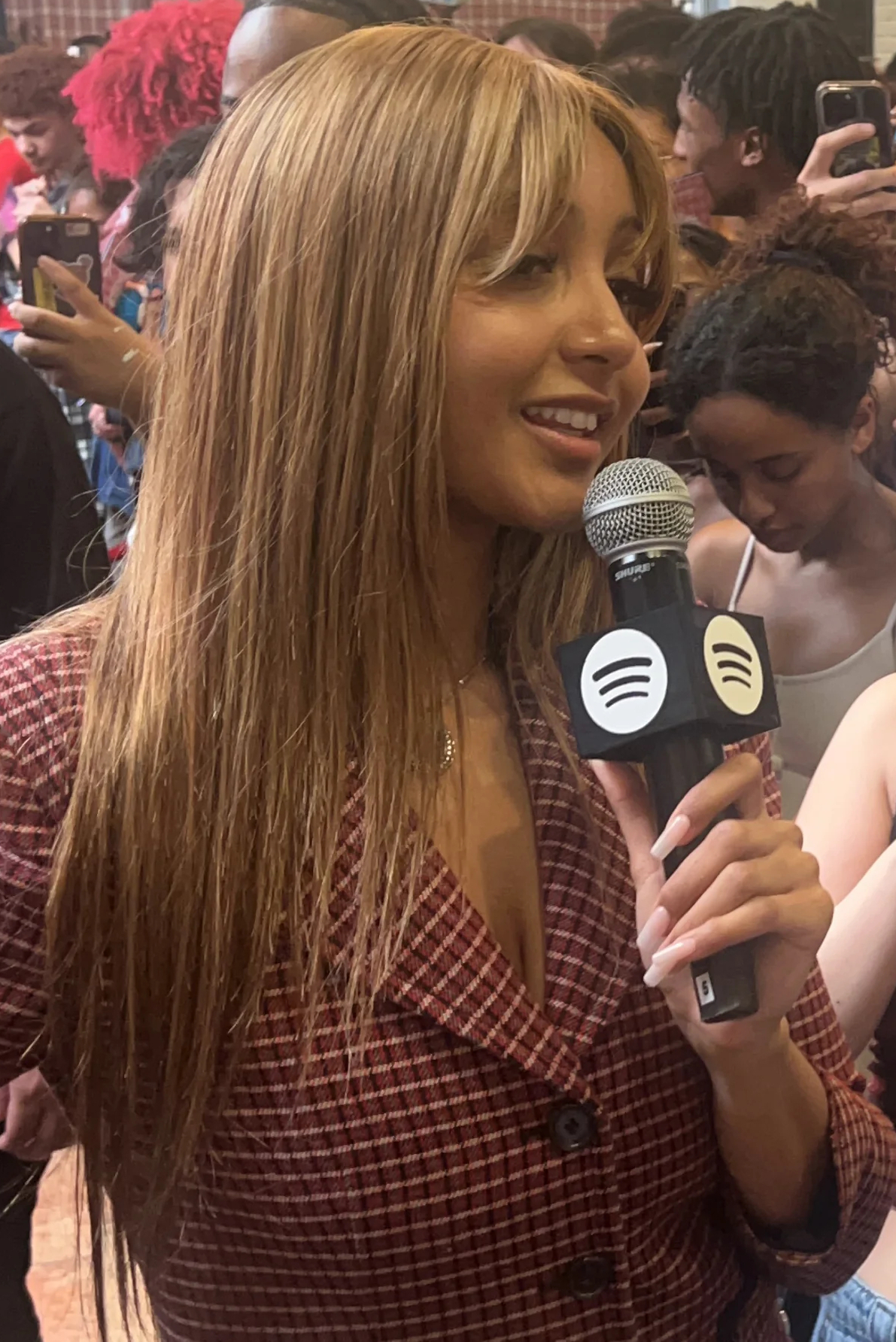
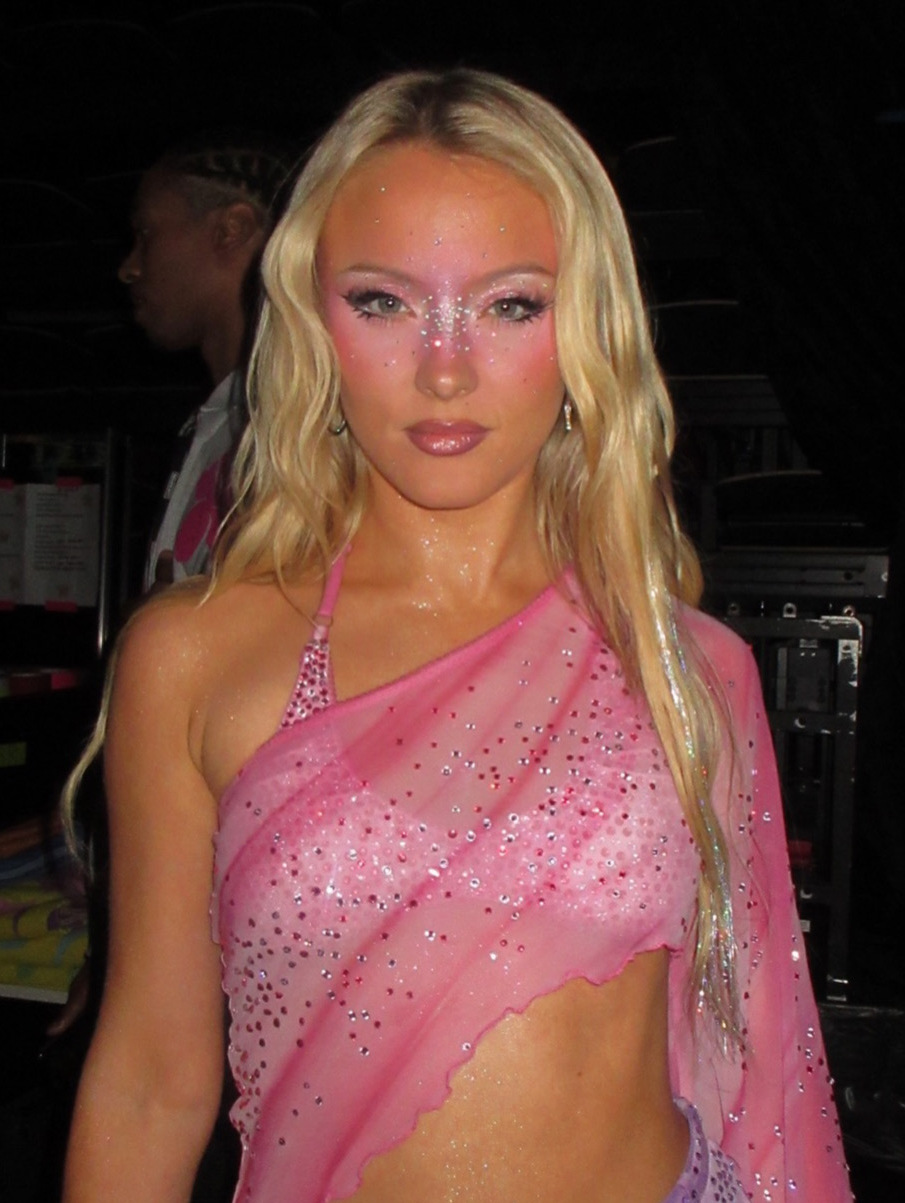
- "Stateside" by PinkPantheress & Zara Larsson is the most recent recipient
- Awarded for: the best collaboration
- Country: United States
- Presented by: American Music Awards
- First award: 2015
- Currently held by: PinkPantheress and Zara Larsson – "Stateside"

Highlights
- Most wins: Camila Cabello and Justin Bieber (3)
- Most nominations: Justin Bieber (6)
- Website: theamas.com

The American Music Award for Collaboration of the Year has been awarded since 2015. Years reflect the year in which the awards were presented, for works released in the previous year (until 2003 onward when awards were handed out in November of the same year). The all-time winner in this category are Camila Cabello and Justin Bieber with 3 wins. Justin Bieber is also the most nominated artist with 6 nominations.

== Winners and nominees ==
=== 2010s ===
Year	Artist	Song	Ref
2015 (43rd)
2015 (43rd)	Jack Ü (featuring Justin Bieber)	"Where Are Ü Now"	
2015 (43rd)	Wiz Khalifa (featuring Charlie Puth)	"See You Again"	
2015 (43rd)	Rihanna, Kanye West and Paul McCartney	"FourFiveSeconds"	
2015 (43rd)	Mark Ronson (featuring Bruno Mars)	"Uptown Funk"	
2015 (43rd)	Taylor Swift (featuring Kendrick Lamar)	"Bad Blood"	
2016 (44th)
2016 (44th)	Fifth Harmony (featuring Ty Dolla Sign)	"Work from Home"	
2016 (44th)	The Chainsmokers (featuring Daya)	"Don't Let Me Down"	
2016 (44th)	Drake (featuring Wizkid and Kyla)	"One Dance"	
2016 (44th)	Rihanna (featuring Drake)	"Work"	
2016 (44th)	Meghan Trainor (featuring John Legend)	"Like I'm Gonna Lose You"	
2017 (45th)
2017 (45th)	Luis Fonsi and Daddy Yankee (featuring Justin Bieber)	"Despacito"	
2017 (45th)	The Chainsmokers (featuring Halsey)	"Closer"	
2017 (45th)	DJ Khaled (featuring Justin Bieber, Quavo, Chance the Rapper and Lil Wayne)	"I'm the One"	
2017 (45th)	Maroon 5 (featuring Kendrick Lamar)	"Don't Wanna Know"	
2017 (45th)	The Weeknd (featuring Daft Punk)	"Starboy"	
2018 (46th)
2018 (46th)	Camila Cabello (featuring Young Thug)	"Havana"	
2018 (46th)	Bebe Rexha (featuring Florida Georgia Line)	"Meant to Be"	
2018 (46th)	Bruno Mars (featuring Cardi B)	"Finesse"	
2018 (46th)	Post Malone (featuring 21 Savage)	"Rockstar"	
2018 (46th)	Zedd, Maren Morris and Grey	"The Middle"	
2019 (47th)
2019 (47th)	Shawn Mendes and Camila Cabello	"Señorita"	
2019 (47th)	Lady Gaga and Bradley Cooper	"Shallow"	
2019 (47th)	Lil Nas X (featuring Billy Ray Cyrus)	"Old Town Road"	
2019 (47th)	Marshmello and Bastille	"Happier"	
2019 (47th)	Post Malone and Swae Lee	"Sunflower"	

=== 2020s ===
Year	Artist	Song	Ref
2020 (48th)
2020 (48th)	Dan + Shay and Justin Bieber	"10,000 Hours"	
2020 (48th)	Cardi B (featuring Megan Thee Stallion)	"WAP"	
2020 (48th)	DaBaby (featuring Roddy Ricch)	"Rockstar"	
2020 (48th)	Lady Gaga and Ariana Grande	"Rain on Me"	
2020 (48th)	Megan Thee Stallion (featuring Beyoncé)	"Savage (Remix)"	
2021 (49th)
2021 (49th)	Doja Cat (featuring SZA)	"Kiss Me More"	
2021 (49th)	24kGoldn (featuring Iann Dior)	"Mood"	
2021 (49th)	Bad Bunny and Jhay Cortez	"Dakiti"	
2021 (49th)	Chris Brown and Young Thug	"Go Crazy"	
2021 (49th)	Justin Bieber (featuring Daniel Caesar and Giveon)	"Peaches"	
2022 (50th)
2022 (50th)	Elton John and Dua Lipa	"Cold Heart (Pnau remix)"	
2022 (50th)	Future (featuring Drake and Tems)	"Wait For U"	
2022 (50th)	Carolina Gaitán, Mauro Castillo, Adassa, Rhenzy Feliz, Diane Guerrero, Stephanie Beatriz, and the Encanto Cast	"We Don’t Talk About Bruno"	
2022 (50th)	The Kid Laroi and Justin Bieber	"Stay"	
2022 (50th)	Lil Nas X (featuring Jack Harlow)	"Industry Baby"	
2025 (51st)
2025 (51st)	Lady Gaga and Bruno Mars	"Die with a Smile"	
2025 (51st)	Kendrick Lamar and SZA	"Luther"	
2025 (51st)	Marshmello and Kane Brown	"Miles on It"	
2025 (51st)	Post Malone (featuring Morgan Wallen)	"I Had Some Help"	
2025 (51st)	Rosé and Bruno Mars	"APT."	
2025 (51st)	Taylor Swift (featuring Post Malone)	"Fortnight"	
2026 (52nd)
2026 (52nd)	PinkPantheress and Zara Larsson	"Stateside"	
2026 (52nd)	BigXthaPlug and Bailey Zimmerman	"All the Way"	
2026 (52nd)	David Guetta, Teddy Swims and Tones and I	"Gone Gone Gone"	
2026 (52nd)	Morgan Wallen and Tate McRae	"What I Want"	
2026 (52nd)	Shaboozey and Jelly Roll	"Amen"	

== Category facts ==
=== Multiple wins ===
3 wins

- Camila Cabello
- Justin Bieber

=== Multiple nominations ===
6 nominations

- Justin Bieber

4 nominations

- Bruno Mars
- Post Malone

3 nominations

- Camila Cabello
- Drake
- Kendrick Lamar
- Lady Gaga

2 nominations

- Cardi B
- The Chainsmokers
- Lil Nas X
- Marshmello
- Megan Thee Stallion
- Rihanna
- SZA
- Taylor Swift
- Morgan Wallen
- Young Thug
