= Muyiwa Awoniyi =

Nigerian music executive

Muyiwa Awoniyi is a Nigerian music executive and founder of BSB Management Agency – a talent management firm based in Lagos, Nigeria. He is known for managing Grammy award winning artist – Tems and Omah Lay. Awoniyi is the convener of the talent mentorship program, Insights By Muyiwa and the founder of Faceless Distribution and the podcast – The Donawon Pod.

== Career ==
Awoniyi established BSB Management Agency focusing on artist management, career development and brand partnership. His agency represents notable Nigerian artists including Tems, Omah Lay, Lekka Beats and Nonso Amadi – a former talent with the agency.

In 2022, Awoniyi launched Insights By Muyiwa, a music career mentorship event holding in Nigeria, Ghana and London. He also founded Faceless Distribution, a platform supporting independent artists. From 2020 to 2022, he hosted The Donawon Pod, discussing topics such as intellectual property, Royalties and mental health with guests like Naeto C, Sarz, and Oxlade.

== Recognition ==
In December 2022, Awoniyi appeared on the TurnTable's Power List - Top 30 Music Executives In Nigeria. That same month, Awoniyi Billboard named Awoniyi as Executive of the Week following the global success of Tems.The Culture Custodian included Awoniyi on its list of the "24 Nigerian Music Business Executives Who Owned 2022".
