= Fountains (song) =

2021 song by Drake featuring Tems

Song by Drake featuring Tems

from the album Certified Lover Boy
- Released: September 3, 2021
- Genre: Afrobeats
- Length: 3:12
- Label: Republic; OVO
- Songwriters: Aubrey Graham; Temilade Openiyi; Tresor Riziki
- Producers: TRESOR; Hubert Batundi; Monsune; 40

"Fountains" is a song by Canadian rapper and singer Drake, featuring vocals from Nigerian singer Tems. It was released through Republic Records and OVO Sound as the sixteenth track from Drake's sixth studio album, Certified Lover Boy, on September 3, 2021. Produced by TRESOR, Monsune, and 40 who recorded and mixed the song.

== Reception ==
Tim Sendra of AllMusic saw the "sunny" song as "one of the album's highlights", and Nathan Evans of Clash was reminded of Tems' feature on fellow Nigerian singer Wizkid's 2021 single, "Essence".

== Charts ==
Chart performance for "Fountains"
Chart (2021)	Peak position
Australia (ARIA)	36
Australia Hip-Hop/R&B Singles (ARIA)	26
Canada Hot 100 (Billboard)	36
France (SNEP)	70
Global 200 (Billboard)	26
Greece International (IFPI)	57
Lithuania (AGATA)	40
Portugal (AFP)	43
South Africa (TOSAC)	14
Sweden Heatseeker (Sverigetopplistan)	7
UK Audio Streaming (Official Charts)	23
US Billboard Hot 100	26
US Hot R&B/Hip-Hop Songs (Billboard)	18

== Certifications ==
Certifications for "Fountains"
Region	Certification	Certified units/sales
Australia (ARIA)	Gold	35,000^{‡}
New Zealand (RMNZ)	Gold	15,000^{‡}
United Kingdom (BPI)	Silver	200,000^{‡}
^{‡} Sales+streaming figures based on certification alone.
