= Giovannie and the Hired Guns =

American country rock band

- Origin: Stephenville, Texas, U.S.
- Genres: Country rock; alternative rock; pop rock
- Years active: 2010–present
- Members: Giovannie Yanez; Alex Trejo; Milton Toles; Carlos Villa; Jerrod Flusche
- Past members: Adam Urbanczyk; Chance Bannister; Tim Rugg

Giovannie and the Hired Guns is an American country rock band from Stephenville, Texas. The band was formed in 2017 by Giovannie Yanez, who serves as the lead vocalist and songwriter. The other members of the band include Carlos Villa (lead guitar), Jerrod Flusche (rhythm guitar), Alex Trejo (bass guitar), and Milton Toles (drums).

The band's music is known for its modern take on traditional country music, blending classic country sounds with rock and roll influences. Some of their popular songs include "Rooster Tattoo" and "Ramon Ayala". They have released four studio albums and one live album. In 2023, the band received the iHeartRadio award for "Best New Rock & Alternative Artist of the Year".

== Discography ==
- Bad Habits (2017)
- Giovannie and the Hired Guns (2020)
- Tejano Punk Boyz (2022)
- Tejano Punk Boyz Live (2023)
- Quitter (2025)

=== Singles ===
Title	Year	Peak chart positions			Album
Title	Year	US Alt.	US Main.	US Rock Air.	Album
"Better Days"	2017	―	―	―	Bad Habits
"Another Time"	2018	―	―	―	Bad Habits
"Lover Boy"	2019	―	―	―	Giovannie and the Hired Guns
"Ramon Ayala" (original or with Bo Bundy)	2021	3	2	1	Tejano Punk Boyz
"Can't Answer Why"	2022	―	―	―	Tejano Punk Boyz
"I Don't Mind"	2022	―	―	―	Tejano Punk Boyz
"Calling You Tonight"	2022	―	―	―	Tejano Punk Boyz
"Overrated"	2022	16	20	30	Tejano Punk Boyz
"Quitter"	2025	36	23	―	Quitter
"Cheap Date"	2026	38	―	―	TBA
"—" denotes a recording that did not chart or was not released in that territory.

== Music videos ==
List of music videos, showing year released and director
Title	Year	Director(s)
"Another Time"	2018	Christian Rangel
"Lover Boy"	2019	
"Ramon Ayala"	2021	Tim Cofield
"Can't Answer Why"	2022	Tim Cofield
"Ramon Ayala" (feat. Bo Bundy)	2022	Bo Bundy
"I Don't Mind"	2022	Tim Cofield
"Calling You Tonight"	2022	Tim Cofield
"Overrated"	2022	Tim Cofield
"Numb"	2024	Alex Ayala, Benny Jenkins
"Cheap Tequila"	2024	Bo Bundy and Giovanni Yanez
"Quitter"	2025	Barf
