= Higher (Tems song) =

2020 song by Tems

Song by Tems

from the EP For Broken Ears
- Released: September 25, 2020
- Genre: R&B, Soul
- Length: 3:16
- Label: Leading Vibes
- Songwriter: Temilade Openiyi
- Producer: Tejiri Akpoghene

"Higher" is a song by Nigerian singer, songwriter and record producer Tems. It was released through Leading Vibes as the fifth track from Tems debut extended play, For Broken Ears, on September 25, 2020. It was produced by Tems alongside Tejiri Akpoghene.

== Background ==
Tems released the song in her debut EP and appeared on the Genius show, Open Mic, where she performed a live acoustic rendition of the song in 2021.

It gained traction in 2022 after it was sampled on Future's "Wait for U" featuring Drake and Tems, the latter from the credits which debuted atop the Billboard Hot 100 earning Tems her first number one song on the chart.

== Charts ==
Weekly chart performance for "Higher"
Chart (2022)	Peak position
UK Afrobeats (OCC)	6
US Afrobeats Songs (Billboard)	5

== Certifications ==
Certifications for "Higher"
Region	Certification	Certified units/sales
Canada (Music Canada)	Gold	40,000^{‡}
New Zealand (RMNZ)	Platinum	30,000^{‡}
United Kingdom (BPI)	Silver	200,000^{‡}
United States (RIAA)	Platinum	1,000,000^{‡}
^{‡} Sales+streaming figures based on certification alone.

== Release history ==
Release history and formats for "Higher"
Region	Date	Format	Label
Various	25 September 2020	Digital download; streaming	Leading Vibe
