= R&B/Hip-Hop Airplay =

Billboard chart

R&B/Hip-Hop Airplay (previously known as Hot R&B/Hip-Hop Airplay) is a chart published by Billboard magazine that ranks the top R&B and hip-hop songs in the United States, based on audience impressions from a panel of radio stations monitored by Nielsen Broadcast Data Systems. It was also used in sister publication R&R, which listed the chart as Urban National Airplay. The chart is not the R&B/hip-hop subset of the Hot 100 Airplay chart, but rather uses a separate panel of R&B stations in urban and urban adult contemporary markets. It was the primary airplay component chart of the US Hot R&B/Hip-Hop Songs chart until the issue dated October 20, 2012, when Hot R&B/Hip-Hop Songs was revamped to include digital sales, streaming, and airplay from all radio formats. The Hot R&B/Hip-Hop Airplay chart encompasses two separate airplay charts, both of which are based on radio spins rather than audience impressions: Mainstream R&B/Hip-Hop and Adult R&B Airplay, which measure airplay on urban contemporary and urban adult contemporary stations respectively.

== Chart criteria ==
There are fifty positions on the chart, which is solely based on radio airplay. 77 R&B and hip-hop radio stations are electronically monitored 24 hours a day, seven days a week by Nielsen Broadcast Data Systems. Songs are ranked by a calculation of the total number of spins per week with its audience impression, which is based upon exact times of airplay and each station's Arbitron listener data.

Songs receiving the greatest growth will receive a "bullet", although there are tracks that will also get bullets if the loss in detections does not exceed the percentage of downtime from a monitored station. "Airpower" awards are issued to songs that appear on the top 20 of both the airplay and audience chart for the first time, while the "greatest gainer" award is given to song with the largest increase in detections. A song with six or more spins in its first week is awarded an "airplay add". If a song is tied for the most spins in the same week, the one with the biggest increase that previous week will rank higher, but if both songs show the same amount of spins regardless of detection the song that is being played at more stations is ranked higher. Songs that fall below the top 20 and have been on the chart after 26 weeks are removed and go to recurrent status.

== Artist achievements ==
=== Most number-ones ===
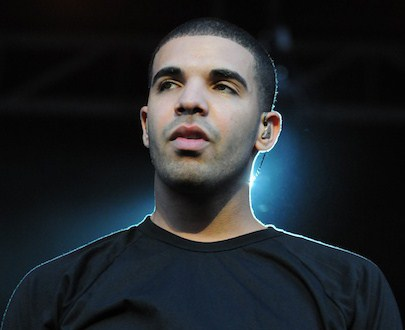
Drake holds the record for the most number-one songs on the R&B/Hip-Hop Airplay chart since its inception in 1992 with a total of 29.

Eight number-ones or more
Position	Artist name	Tally of number-ones	Ref.
1	Drake	29	
2	Usher	16	
3	Chris Brown	12	
3	Lil Wayne	12	
4	Beyoncé	10	
5	R. Kelly	8	
5	Alicia Keys	8	
5	Jay-Z	8	

=== Artists with the most consecutive weeks at number one ===
- 29 weeks: Chris Brown and Young Thug – "Go Crazy"
- 27 weeks: Chris Brown and Drake – "No Guidance"
- 27 weeks: Wizkid, Tems and Justin Bieber — "Essence"
- 22 weeks: Miguel — "Adorn"
- 20 weeks: Cardi B — "Money" (9 weeks) → "Please Me" (Cardi B and Bruno Mars) (11 weeks)
- 18 weeks: Lil Wayne — "Motivation" (Kelly Rowland featuring Lil Wayne) (7 weeks) → "I'm On One" (DJ Khaled featuring Drake, Rick Ross and Lil Wayne) (11 weeks)
- 17 weeks: Alicia Keys — "No One" (10 weeks) → Like You'll Never See Me Again" (7 weeks)

== Most top-ten hits ==
Artist name	Tally of top-tens	Ref.
Drake	93	
Chris Brown	60	
Lil Wayne	50	
Nicki Minaj	36	
Jay-Z	35	
Usher	35	
Beyoncé	35	
R. Kelly	33	
Mary J. Blige	30	
Ludacris	28	

== Most entries ==
Artist name	Tally of entries	Ref.
Drake	163	
Lil Wayne	138	
Chris Brown	129	
Jay-Z	119	
R. Kelly	100	
Mary J. Blige	88	
Nicki Minaj	87	
Future	84	
Kanye West	83	
Usher	71	

== Song achievements ==
=== Most weeks at number one ===
- 37 weeks

"Snooze" – SZA (2023–24)

- 29 weeks

"Go Crazy" – Chris Brown and Young Thug (2020–21)
"Folded" – Kehlani (2026)

- 27 weeks

"No Guidance" – Chris Brown featuring Drake (2019–20)
"Essence" – Wizkid featuring Justin Bieber and Tems (2021–22)

- 23 weeks

"Adorn" – Miguel (2012–13)

- 22 weeks

"Free Mind" – Tems (2022–23)

- 18 weeks

"Leave the Door Open" – Silk Sonic (Bruno Mars and Anderson .Paak) (2021)

- 16 weeks

"Boo'd Up" – Ella Mai (2018)
"TGIF" – GloRilla (2024–25)
"Luther" – Kendrick Lamar and SZA (2025)

=== Shortest climbs to number one ===
- 5th week

"Untitled (How Does It Feel)" – D'Angelo (2000)
"Irreplaceable" – Beyoncé (2006)
"God's Plan" – Drake (2018)

- 6th week

"Single Ladies (Put a Ring on It)" – Beyoncé (2008)
"Blame It" – Jamie Foxx featuring T-Pain (2009)
"Drunk in Love" – Beyoncé featuring Jay-Z (2014)
"Work" – Rihanna featuring Drake (2016)
"Black Beatles" – Rae Sremmurd featuring Gucci Mane (2016)
"Nice For What" – Drake (2018)
"Break My Soul" – Beyoncé (2022)

=== Longest climbs to number one ===
- 35th week "Step in the Name of Love" – R. Kelly (2003)
- 33rd week "Free Mind" – Tems (2022)
- 31st week "You" – Lloyd featuring Lil Wayne (2007)
- 29th week "Snap Yo Fingers" – Lil Jon (2005) & "There Goes My Baby" – Usher (2010)
- 23rd week "If I Ain't Got You" – Alicia Keys (2004)
- 25th week "Needed Me" – Rihanna (2016)
- 24th week "Planez" – Jeremih featuring J. Cole (2015)
- 21st week "Spotlight" – Jennifer Hudson (2008)
- 20th week "Love of My Life (An Ode to Hip-Hop)" – Erykah Badu featuring Common (2002) & "Love On Top" – Beyoncé (2012)

Note: Above two lists only considers songs that charted from the year 2000 onwards.

== Other records and notable achievements ==
- "Adorn" by Miguel was the first song to spend at least 20 weeks atop the chart. Billboard reported that the track was able to do so because the R&B/Hip-Hop Airplay chart reporting panel is composed of a variety of mainstream and adult R&B radio stations. Skip Dillard, the operations manager at adult R&B WBLS New York, stated that Miguel appeals to listeners in both the 25-34 and 35-54 age groups, thus maximizing the reach of his audience. "Adorn" went on to spend a total of 23 weeks at number-one, which was, at that point, a record.
- Beyoncé holds the record for the most number-ones among female acts, with ten. Alicia Keys follows with eight, Brandy follows with five, and Aaliyah, Erykah Badu and Mariah Carey, all three of whom have attained four.
- The 1993 single "That's the Way Love Goes" by American singer Janet Jackson holds the record for being the only song in the history of the chart to debut at number one, which did so in May 1993.
