= Black Panther: Wakanda Forever (soundtrack) =

2022 albums

The soundtrack for the 2022 American superhero film Black Panther: Wakanda Forever, the sequel to Black Panther (2018) based on the Marvel Comics character of the same name, is produced by Marvel Studios and consists of an original score composed and produced by Ludwig Göransson. He has worked as the composer for Ryan Coogler's previous films. Göransson, who confirmed his involvement in the film in September 2021, also produced and curated most of the original songs for the album.

Since the storyline is primarily set in the underwater civilization of Talokan, and is rooted in Mesoamerican, Wakandan, and Nigerian cultures, Göransson went to Mexico City to research and recreate the Mayan music, feeling that the music is forcibly erased from history. Various ancient instruments from these cultures were utilized for the score to recreate the Mayan music, which he felt he had "never heard in a film before," while the orchestra and Mayan sounds were produced into the score. The theme for T'Challa, the titular protagonist in the first film, was altered and integrated into the score. Recording for the soundtrack and score happened simultaneously in Mexico and Lagos, with additional recording in Los Angeles. Göransson collaborated with contemporary artists — rappers, singers, indigenous musicians, and indigenous singers for recording the original songs in the album.

A soundtrack extended play titled Black Panther: Wakanda Forever Prologue was released by Hollywood Records and Marvel Music on July 25, 2022, featuring three songs, including Tems' cover of Bob Marley's "No Woman, No Cry" which was featured in the teaser trailer. The soundtrack album was released as Black Panther: Wakanda Forever – Music from and Inspired By on November 4, by Roc Nation, Def Jam Recordings, and Hollywood Records, with Rihanna's original single "Lift Me Up" releasing a week before the album, on October 28. The soundtrack album received critical acclaim. Göransson's score album was released as Black Panther: Wakanda Forever (Original Score) by Hollywood Records on November 11, coinciding with the film's release.

== Production ==
=== Original score ===
Wakanda Forever partially takes place in the underwater civilization of Talokan, the city where Namor resides. Tālocān is rooted in Mesoamerican culture, and Wakanda is rooted in African culture. Göransson worked with several musical archaeologists to extensively research and recreate the Mayan music, as he felt that "the music was forcibly erased from the world, hundreds of years ago" and also went to Mexico City, to possibly recreate the sound of Mayan. In the research, several instruments from the graves were found, including flutes with multiple components and fingerprints demonstrating how the instrument can be played. Göransson opined that, "a lot of the instruments are from nature. So it's like seashells, there are turtle shells that you hit with sticks, there are different kinds of clay flutes that make the sounds of birds, and shakers that sound like snakes. It was so inspiring to hear all these sounds that I never heard before and definitely never heard in a movie before."

Namor's sound was a seashell, hence Göransson played his theme using the object since it was an integral part of the script. He felt that seashell is a difficult instrument to play, as "the tone can sometimes be similar to a French horn, but you don't have the same range in tonality and intervals. Göransson explains, "You're very limited in your notes and how you could access the notes fast because you're basically changing the notes by just putting your hand in the seashell. So it was kind of a combination of two different seashells because we had to experiment a little bit to get the exact melody that I wanted. And sometimes when you see Namor by himself, in a more intimate setting, it's just a solo seashell melody. But then, when you see him with all his people, ready to go to war, it's the seashell accompanied by eight French horns. So it gets an extra power to it." Another instrument that portrays the sound of Namor, was the "death whistle," a clay flute which sound like a "crazy, otherworldly animal scream," which represents Namor's action or strength, resulting in the abrasive sound. Several vocal sounds were used for the citizens of Tālocāns, which were described it as "low male, throat singing type vocals."

T'Challa's theme from the first film was altered in the sequel, as he felt that, "the theme is the same, but immersed with another character." A new theme was written for Shuri to underscore the process of grief and anger, as "when you first hear the theme, it's sung by Jorja Smith and throughout the story, that theme evolves to evoke the kind of leader that Shuri wants to be. It even takes on a completely different shape in the form of a bombastic synthesizer." Riri Williams / Ironheart also had a unique theme, which Göransson had stated, "she's from Chicago, so the culture of the city is part of her sound. I'm learning about this very progressive music city, including house and hip hop, so I'm just dipping my toe in her character."

=== Songs ===
Göransson produced most of the songs and served as the executive producer of the soundtrack in addition to composing the score, which he described as a "seamless process." While recording the score during the daytime, with the Mayan instruments and sounds, he also recorded songs with contemporary artists and used the elements which he would record for the score, in the songs. The music production began as Ryan Coogler was filming Wakanda Forever, discussing the script with the artists along the way by adding "every note, every word, every lyric, everything was written specifically for the movie." At the recording in Mexico, the song "Laayli' kuxa'ano'one", performed by Mayan rappers Pat Boy, Yaalen K’uj, and All Mayan Winik, was first recorded which was set during the end credits.

Another session was held in Lagos, Nigeria where three songs were recorded: a cover version of "No Woman, No Cry", performed by Tems, "Coming Back for You" performed by Fireboy DML, and "Anya mmiri" performed by CKay featuring PinkPantheress. Göransson wrote the song, "Árboles bajo el mar", which was co-written by Vivir Quintana along with Mare Advertencia. It describes Namor's origin story, where his mother is forced to move into the ocean to escape the brutal assault of the Talokan, Göransson said, "That song was so powerful that some of that vocal melody I used later on in the theme for the Talokan siren song that they use to hypnotize people. I kind of got hypnotized myself when she [Quintana] started singing and pushing out air when she was breathing. It needed to be enticing and threatening, and we had that sung by a choir of Mexican singers." Another track, "Con la brisa", was performed by Mexican singer Foudeqush, which was played when Namor took Shuri on a tour to Talokan. T'Challa's theme plays at the beginning of the song, with the lyrics of the song punctuated over the drum motif.

On October 18, 2022, it was confirmed that singer Rihanna had recorded two original songs for the film's soundtrack: "Lift Me Up" and "Born Again". The former was officially announced on October 26, 2022, as her first solo single release since "Love on the Brain" (2016), and was released as a single, two days later. A music video to accompany the single was released on Rihanna's official YouTube channel on the same day. Göransson produced and co-wrote the track, with Rihanna, Coogler and Tems. He said that the song is a tribute to the late Chadwick Boseman, who played T'Challa, the titular protagonist in Black Panther; Boseman died of cancer in August 2020. According to Clash, "Lift Me Up" is an "emotive" R&B ballad that "speaks from the heart." The song was met with a mixed critical reception, but performed well commercially, reaching number one in Switzerland, number two on the US Billboard Hot 100, number three on UK Official Singles Chart, and featured in the top 10 in 10 other countries. It also topped the Billboard Hot R&B/Hip-Hop Songs and Hot R&B Songs charts.

== Albums ==
=== Black Panther: Wakanda Forever Prologue ===
Black Panther: Wakanda Forever Prologue

EP by Various artists
- Released: July 25, 2022
- Length: 9:33
- Labels: Hollywood; Marvel Music

A soundtrack extended play titled, Black Panther: Wakanda Forever Prologue (or simply Wakanda Forever Prologue), was released by Hollywood Records on July 25, 2022. It featured Tems' cover of Bob Marley's "No Woman, No Cry", which was used in the film's teaser trailer, along with two other songs: "A Body, A Coffin" by Amaarae, and "Soy" by Santa Fe Klan. Göransson produced all three songs and also served as one of the songwriters for "A Body, A Coffin".

==== Track listing ====
No.	Title	Writer(s)	Producer(s)	Length
1.	"No Woman, No Cry" (performed by Tems)	Tems; Vincent Ford	Ludwig Göransson	3:34
2.	"A Body, A Coffin" (performed by Amaarae)	Amaarae; Kyu Steed; Joel Mason "Maesu" Tanner; Kwame "KZ" Kwei-Armah Jr.; Göransson	Göransson; Steed; Kwei-Armah Jr.; Ayodeji "Cracker Mallo" Olowu	2:50
3.	"Soy" (performed by Santa Fe Klan)	Angel Jair Quezada Jasso; Göransson	Göransson	3:09
Total length:				9:33

=== Black Panther: Wakanda Forever – Music from and Inspired By ===
Black Panther: Wakanda Forever – Music from and Inspired By

Soundtrack album by Rihanna, Tems and various artists
- Released: November 4, 2022
- Recorded: 2021–2022
- Venues: Ogidi Studios (Lagos, Nigeria); El Desierto Recording Studio (Mexico City, Mexico); Abbey Road Studios (London, England); Newman Scoring Stage, 20th Century Studios (Los Angeles, California, United States)
- Genres: Hip hop; R&B; pop rap; trap
- Length: 66:18
- Labels: Roc Nation; Def Jam; Hollywood
- Producers: Ludwig Göransson; Ryan Coogler; Archie Davis; Dave Jordan

Singles from Black Panther: Wakanda Forever – Music from and Inspired By
- 1. "Lift Me Up" Released: October 28, 2022

Black Panther: Wakanda Forever – Music from and Inspired By, a compilation soundtrack album for the film was announced in late-October and was released by Roc Nation, Def Jam Recordings and Hollywood Records on November 4, 2022. The album featured Rihanna's original single, "Lift Me Up" alongside several incorporated songs performed by an array of international artists from South Africa, Mexico and Nigeria, notably Burna Boy, Snow Tha Product, E-40, Stormzy, Fireboy DML, Tobe Nwigwe, Future, PinkPantheress and several others. Göransson, who executive produced the soundtrack, said in an interview, "Ryan and I talked about the importance of creating an immersive journey of sound and voice. If we used a song in the film, we wanted it to be the entire song, and to be connected to the story. Thematically, we wanted to move the audience from grief to celebration. When you listen to the soundtrack, you can close your eyes and relive the experience of the movie. That was the intention." On November 11, 2022, "Born Again", a song performed by Rihanna, was added as the album's final track through various streaming services.

==== Track listing ====
No.	Title	Writer(s)	Producer(s)	Length
1.	"Lift Me Up" (performed by Rihanna)	Ludwig Göransson; Robyn Fenty; Ryan Coogler; Temilade Openiyi	Göransson	3:16
2.	"Love & Loyalty (Believe)" (performed by Busiswa, DBN Gogo, Sino Msolo, Kamo Mphela, and Young Stunna)	Busiswa; Elton Ndangi Kimobana; Kamogelo Matona; Mandisa Radebe; Sandile Fortune Msimango; Sinoyolo Msolo	Gogo; EltonK	6:20
3.	"Alone" (performed by Burna Boy)	Damini Ogulu; Göransson; Peace Oredope	P.Priime; Göransson	3:41
4.	"No Woman, No Cry" (performed by Tems)	Vincent Ford	Göransson	3:33
5.	"Árboles bajo el mar" (performed by Mare Advertencia Lirika and Vivir Quintana)	Göransson; Alejandro Néstor Méndez Rojas; Marlene Ramirez Cruz; Viviana Montserrat Quintana Rodríguez	Göransson	4:21
6.	"Con la brisa" (performed by Foudeqush and Göransson)	Angela Paola Maldonado Flores; Göransson	Göransson	2:47
7.	"La vida" (performed by Snow Tha Product featuring E-40)	Claudia Meza; Earl Stevens; Gilberto Gutierrez; Gisela Reina; Iván Felipe Fernández; Juan Francisco Galván; Octavio Vega; Göransson	Göransson	2:37
8.	"Interlude" (performed by Stormzy)	Göransson; Michael Owuo Jr.	Göransson	2:18
9.	"Coming Back for You" (performed by Fireboy DML)	Adedamola Adefolahan; Göransson; Peace Oredope	P.Priime; Göransson	2:56
10.	"They Want It, But No" (performed by Tobe Nwigwe and Fat Nwigwe)	Göransson; Nwigwe	Göransson; Ngawang Samphel	2:37
11.	"Laayli' kuxa'ano'one" (performed by ADN Maya Colectivo: Pat Boy, Yaalen K'uj, and All Mayan Winik)	Göransson; Antonio de Jesus Chan Guerra; Jesus Cristobal Pat Chable; Roy Elisur Gongora Magaña	Göransson	3:44
12.	"Limoncello" (performed by OG DayV and Future)	David Teel; Nayvadius Wilburn; Noah Coogler	DTB	2:34
13.	"Anya mmiri" (performed by CKay featuring PinkPantheress)	Chukwuka Ekweani; John Orji; Göransson; Peace Oredope; Victoria Walker	P.Priime; Göransson	3:08
14.	"Wake Up" (performed by Bloody Civilian featuring Rema)	Divine Ikubor; Emoseh Khamofu; Hassan Bello	Civilian; Göransson	2:42
15.	"Pantera" (performed by Alemán featuring Rema)	Ikubor; Alemán; Göransson	Göransson	2:49
16.	"Jele" (performed by Busiswa, Gogo, Msolo, Mphela, and Stunna)	Busiswa; Matona; Malique China; Radebe; Msimango; Msolo	Gogo; Unlimited Soul	3:49
17.	"Inframundo" (performed by Blue Rojo)	Göransson; Santiago Ogarrio	Göransson	3:11
18.	"No digas mi nombre" (performed by Calle x vida and Foudeqush)	Göransson; Cristian Jesus Bautista Espinoza; Donovan Pérez; Josué Fernandez; Mario Aguilar Millan	Göransson	3:42
19.	"Mi pueblo" (performed by Guadalupe de Jesús Chan Poot)	Poot	Göransson	2:40
20.	"Born Again" (performed by Rihanna)	James Fauntleroy; Göransson; Fenty; Terius Nash	Göransson; The-Dream	3:33
Total length:				66:18

=== Black Panther: Wakanda Forever (Original Score) ===
Black Panther: Wakanda Forever (Original Score)

Film score by Ludwig Göransson
- Released: November 11, 2022
- Recorded: 2021–2022
- Studios: Ogidi Studios (Lagos, Nigeria); Abbey Road Studios (London, England); Newman Scoring Stage, 20th Century Studios (Los Angeles, California, United States)
- Genre: Film score
- Length: 83:00
- Labels: Hollywood; Marvel Music
- Producer: Ludwig Göransson

Ludwig Göransson chronology
Turning Red (2022)	Black Panther: Wakanda Forever (Original Score) (2022)	Oppenheimer (2023)

Göransson's score was released as Black Panther: Wakanda Forever (Original Score) by Hollywood Records and Marvel Music on November 11, 2022, the same day as the film's release.

==== Track listing ====
All music is composed by Ludwig Göransson.

No.	Title	Artist(s)	Length
1.	"Nyana Wam"	Baaba Maal; Massamba Diop	4:00
2.	"We Know What You Whisper"	Busiswa	2:36
3.	"Sirens"	Vivir Quintana; Mare Advertencia Lirika	3:56
4.	"Welcome Home"	Maal	2:10
5.	"Lift Me Up" (Score version)	Joselyn Coogler	1:09
6.	"He Wasn't There"	Jorja Smith	1:21
7.	"Namor"		3:41
8.	"They Want It, But No" (Film version)	Tobe Nwigwe; Fat Nwigwe	4:13
9.	"Árboles Bajo El Mar" (Film version)	Quintana; Lirika	6:30
10.	"Lost to the Depths"		1:29
11.	"Con La Brisa" (Film version)	Foudeqush; Göransson	2:40
12.	"Yucatán"		1:41
13.	"Let Us Burn It Together"		3:40
14.	"This Will Mean War"	Magatte Sow	2:09
15.	"Namor's Throne"		2:15
16.	"Imperius Rex"		7:41
17.	"Mama"		4:42
18.	"Who Did You See?"		3:12
19.	"Wakanda Forever"		2:35
20.	"Blood for Blood"		1:28
21.	"Yibambe!"		7:24
22.	"Sink the Ship"		3:51
23.	"It Could Have Been Different"		1:53
24.	"Vengeance Has Consumed Us"		4:04
25.	"Alliance"		1:47
26.	"T'Challa"		1:25
Total length:			83:00

== Reception ==
Professional ratings
Review scores
Source	Rating
Pitchfork	6.4/10
Rolling Stone	4/5 stars
Filmtracks	3/5 stars

In a four-star review, Rolling Stone writer Maura Johnston stated that the Wakanda Forever soundtrack "breaks that trend with verve and gusto in a way befitting a movie about the world's most tech-savvy nation" and also stated "Rihanna is the biggest bold-face name but the entire project is musically rich and carefully curated". Dylan Green of Pitchfork had scored the album 6.4/10 and praised the "staggering sonic diversity", but criticised the absence of a curator for the album, as he felt that "the songs are loosely tied to the movie". Nick Harley of Den of Geek reviewed the album positively, saying that the soundtrack "builds off of its predecessor, showcasing household-name artists and Afro-futurist sounds". Jon Pareles of The New York Times mentioned that the album "draws on musicians and instruments from Africa and Mexico along with American and British rappers and singers", adding that the film "revolves around grief, loyalty, vengeance and territorial security, and its music — both the Inspired By album and a separate Original Score album by Goransson — is largely somber, even ominous". Writing for Universal Music New Zealand, Chantal Dalebroux stated "the musical choices reflect this and Wakanda Forever's general narrative progression".

=== Accolades ===
Accolades received by Black Panther: Wakanda Forever
Award	Date of ceremony	Category	Recipient(s)	Result	Ref.
Academy Awards	March 12, 2023	Best Original Song	"Lift Me Up" (Tems, Rihanna, Coogler, and Göransson)	Nominated	
AFRIMA	January 15, 2023	Best Soundtrack Movie/Series or Documentary	"No Woman, No Cry" (Tems, Ford, and Göransson)	Won	
Black Reel Awards	February 6, 2023	Outstanding Original Soundtrack	Black Panther: Wakanda Forever (Soundtrack) (Ludwig Göransson, Ryan Coogler, Archie Davis, and Dave Jordan)	Won	
Black Reel Awards	February 6, 2023	Outstanding Original Song	"Lift Me Up" (Tems, Rihanna, Coogler, and Göransson)	Won	
Black Reel Awards	February 6, 2023	Outstanding Original Song	"Born Again" (James Fauntleroy, Göransson, Fenty and The-Dream)	Nominated	
Georgia Film Critics Association	January 13, 2023	Best Original Score	Ludwig Göransson	Nominated	
Georgia Film Critics Association	January 13, 2023	Best Original Song	"Lift Me Up" (Tems, Rihanna, Coogler, and Göransson)	Nominated	
Golden Globe Awards	January 10, 2023	Best Original Song	"Lift Me Up" (Tems, Rihanna, Coogler, and Göransson)	Nominated	
Hollywood Critics Association Creative Arts Awards	February 24, 2023	Best Original Song	"Lift Me Up" (Tems, Rihanna, Coogler, and Göransson)	Nominated	
Hollywood Music in Media Awards	November 16, 2022	Best Original Score in a Sci-Fi Film	Ludwig Göransson	Nominated	
Hollywood Music in Media Awards	November 16, 2022	Best Original Song in a Feature Film	"Lift Me Up" (Tems, Rihanna, Coogler, and Göransson)	Won	
Hollywood Music in Media Awards	November 16, 2022	Song/Score – Trailer	"No Woman, No Cry" (Tems, Ford, and Göransson)	Nominated	
NAACP Image Awards	February 25, 2023	Outstanding Soundtrack/Compilation Album	Black Panther: Wakanda Forever (Soundtrack) (Göransson, Coogler, Davis, and Jordan)	Won	
NAACP Image Awards	February 25, 2023	Outstanding Soul/R&B Song	"Lift Me Up" (Tems, Rihanna, Coogler, and Göransson)	Nominated	
NAACP Image Awards	February 25, 2023	Outstanding Music Video	"Lift Me Up" (Tems, Rihanna, Coogler, and Göransson)	Won	
NAACP Image Awards	February 25, 2023	Outstanding International Song	"No Woman, No Cry" (Tems, Ford, and Göransson)	Won	
Satellite Awards	March 3, 2023	Best Original Song	"Lift Me Up" (Tems, Rihanna, Coogler, and Göransson)	Nominated	
Society of Composers & Lyricists Awards	February 15, 2023	Outstanding Original Song for a Dramatic or Documentary Visual Media Production	"Lift Me Up" (Tems, Rihanna, Coogler, and Göransson)	Nominated	
St. Louis Gateway Film Critics Association Awards	December 18, 2022	Best Soundtrack	Black Panther: Wakanda Forever (Soundtrack) (Göransson, Coogler, Davis, and Jordan)	Nominated	

== Charts ==
=== Weekly charts ===
Weekly chart performance for Black Panther: Wakanda Forever – Music from and Inspired By
Chart (2022)	Peak position
Australian Albums (ARIA)	79
Austrian Albums (Ö3 Austria)	38
Belgian Albums (Ultratop Flanders)	50
Belgian Albums (Ultratop Wallonia)	40
Canadian Albums (Billboard)	7
Danish Albums (Hitlisten)	27
Dutch Albums (Album Top 100)	23
French Albums (SNEP)	47
German Albums (Offizielle Top 100)	73
Irish Compilation Albums (IRMA)	2
Japanese Digital Albums (Oricon)	26
Japanese Hot Albums (Billboard Japan)	90
New Zealand Albums (RMNZ)	17
Norwegian Albums (VG-lista)	13
Spanish Albums (Promusicae)	47
Swedish Albums (Sverigetopplistan)	33
Swiss Albums (Schweizer Hitparade)	31
UK Compilation Albums (OCC)	3
UK Album Downloads (Official Charts)	40
UK Soundtrack Albums (Official Charts)	23
US Billboard 200	12
US Soundtrack Albums (Billboard)	1
US World Albums (Billboard)	1

Chart performance for Black Panther: Wakanda Forever (Original Score)
Chart (2022)	Peak position
UK Album Downloads (Official Charts)	66

=== Year-end charts ===
2022 year-end chart performance for Black Panther: Wakanda Forever – Music from and Inspired By
Chart (2022)	Position
French Albums (SNEP)	200

2023 year-end chart performance for Black Panther: Wakanda Forever – Music from and Inspired By
Chart (2023)	Position
US Soundtrack Albums (Billboard)	8
