= For Broken Ears =

EP by Tems
- Released: 25 September 2020
- Genre: R&B, Alté
- Length: 20:41
- Label: Leading Vibes
- Producer: Tems; Spax; Omeiza; Tejiri Akpoghene

Tems chronology
For Broken Ears (2020)	If Orange Was a Place (2021)

Singles from For Broken Ears
- 1. "Damages" Released: 18 September 2020; 2. "Free Mind" Released: 9 August 2022

For Broken Ears is the debut extended play by Nigerian singer, songwriter and producer Tems. It was produced primarily by Tems, along with production from Spax, Omeiza and Tejiri Akpoghene, and was released on 25 September 2020 by Leading Vibes Limited. It spawned front several hits in 2022, including "Higher" which was sampled on Future's number one Billboard Hot 100 hit "Wait for U" and "Free Mind" which debuted on the chart, gaining Tems her first solo appearance.

== Background and release ==
Tems began working on the EP in 2019. All the tracks were written and produced by Tems, except for the lead single "Damages" which was produced by Spax, and "Higher" produced by Tejiri Akpoghene. "The Key" was co-produced by Omeiza, who had worked on several previous songs with Tems.

The lead single "Damages" was released on 18 September 2020, while the EP was released through Leading Vibes on 22 September 2020.

== Critical reception ==
Professional ratings
Review scores
Source	Rating
Pitchfork	7.6/10
Pulse Nigeria	8/10

For Broken Ears received generally positive reviews from music critics. Pitchfork praised the EP, calling it an "R&B record, with swirly synths and airy harmonies", while also noting that Tems's voice could be mistaken for that of an American or British singer. A review by Pulse Nigeria lauded it for the strong themes and tracks, especially "Damages" and "Ice T", while also adding its preferred track arrangement.

== Track listing ==
All tracks are written by Temilade Openiyi.

For Broken Ears track listing
No.	Title	Producer(s)	Length
1.	"Interference"	Tems	2:55
2.	"Ice T"	Tems	4:07
3.	"Free Mind"	Tems; Omeiza	4:07
4.	"Témìládè Interlude"	Tems	0:41
5.	"Higher"	Tems; Tejiri Akpoghene	3:16
6.	"Damages"	Spax	2:49
7.	"The Key"	Tems; Omeiza	2:46
Total length:			20:41

== Charts ==
=== Weekly charts ===
Chart performance for "For Broken Ears"
Chart (2022)	Peak position
US Heatseekers Albums (Billboard)	25
US Independent Albums (Billboard)	28

Chart (2024)	Peak position
Nigerian Albums (TurnTable)	99
