= Damages (song) =

2020 single by Tems

Single by Tems

from the EP For Broken Ears
- Released: 17 September 2020
- Genre: Alt-R&B; Alté
- Length: 2:49
- Label: Leading Vibes
- Songwriter: Temilade Openiyi
- Producer: Spax

Tems singles chronology
"These Days" (2020)	"Damages" (2020)	"Essence" (2021)

Music video
- "Damages" on YouTube

"Damages" is a song by Nigerian singer and record producer Tems. It was released on 17 September 2020. Written by Tems and produced by Spax, the song is the only single from Tems's first EP For Broken Ears, which was released on 25 September 2020.

The song peaked at number one on Apple Nigeria, number two on the Apple Music R&B Songs chart, and at number six on the TurnTable Top 50. On 24 November 2020, "Damages" became the most played song on Nigeria radio.

== Composition ==
"Damages" is an alternative R&B / soul track. Lyrically, it show Tems asking her lover to take a stance in the relationship because she does not want the relationship to fail.

== Critical reception ==
The song received positive reviews from critics. A review from Pulse Nigeria stated that "the song is between a girl power anthem and a refusal of bad treatment", while another review from BellaNaija noted that "The intimate beat of 'Damages' reflects the alternative R&B fused with a Neo-soul sound, and a sprinkle of the traditional Nigerian flavor".

== Music video ==
The music video was released on 23 September 2020. Directed by Ademola Falamo, the visual shows Tems in a clubhouse with her groups of rebels.

== Accolades ==
Year	Award	Category	Nominee/Work	Result	Ref
2021	Net Honours	Most Played Alternative Song	"Damages"	Won	
2021	All Africa Music Awards	Best Female Artiste in Western Africa	"Tems - Damages"	Nominated	
2021	All Africa Music Awards	Best Artiste, Duo or Group in African R&B Soul	"Tems - Damages"	Nominated	
2021	All Africa Music Awards	Breakout Artiste of the Year	"Tems - Damages"	Nominated	

== Charts ==
=== Weekly charts ===
Chart performance for "Damages"
Chart (2020–2022)	Peak position
Nigeria (TurnTable Top 50)	6
Nigeria Top 50 Streaming Songs (TurnTable)	24
Nigeria Top 50 Airplay (TurnTable)	1
UK Afrobeats (OCC)	12
US Afrobeats Songs (Billboard)	12

=== Year-end charts ===
Year-end chart performance for "Damages"
Chart (2020)	Position
Nigeria TurnTable End of the Year (TurnTable)	30

== Certifications ==
Certifications for "Damages"
Region	Certification	Certified units/sales
Canada (Music Canada)	Gold	40,000^{‡}
United Kingdom (BPI)	Silver	200,000^{‡}
^{‡} Sales+streaming figures based on certification alone.
