= Wait for U =

2022 single by Future featuring Drake and Tems

Single by Future featuring Drake and Tems

from the album I Never Liked You
- Released: May 3, 2022
- Genre: R&B
- Length: 3:10
- Label: Epic; Freebandz
- Songwriters: Nayvadius Wilburn; Aubrey Graham; Temilade Openiyi; Michael Mule; Isaac De Boni; Floyd E. Bentley III; Jacob Canady; Tejiri Akpoghene
- Producers: ATL Jacob; FnZ

Future singles chronology
"Hold That Heat" (2022)	"Wait for U" (2022)	"Keep It Burnin" (2022)

Drake singles chronology
"Knife Talk" (2021)	"Wait for U" (2022)	"Massive" / "Sticky" (2022)

Tems singles chronology
"Crazy Tings" (2021)	"Wait for U" (2022)	"No Woman, No Cry" (2022)

Music video
- "Wait for U" on YouTube

"Wait for U" is a song by American rapper Future featuring Canadian rapper Drake and Nigerian singer Tems. It was sent to rhythmic contemporary radio as the second single from Future's ninth studio album, I Never Liked You, on May 3, 2022. The song samples Tems' song, "Higher", from her debut extended play, For Broken Ears (2020). Future and Drake wrote the song with producers FnZ (Finatik and Zac) and ATL Jacob, alongside Tejiri Akpoghene and Tems, who are credited songwriters for the sampling of "Higher", and Floyd E. Bentley III. "Wait for U" is an R&B song that lyrically discusses the occasional toxicity of a romantic relationship.

"Wait For U" debuted at number one on the US Billboard Hot 100, becoming Future's second (first as a lead artist), Drake's tenth, and Tems' first number-one hit on the Hot 100, and peaked within the top 10 of the charts in many other countries, including Canada, United Kingdom and New Zealand. The song received two nominations at the 65th Annual Grammy Awards: Best Rap Song and Best Melodic Rap Performance, winning the latter.

== Critical reception ==
Michael Di Gennaro of Exclaim! felt that "Wait for U" is one of "the most Drake-sounding Future songs from a production standpoint" with "tender moments that harken back to the popstar aspirations Future once had when writing songs for Rihanna and Ciara". In a negative review, HipHopDX music critic Anthony Malone opined that both "Wait for U" and "I'm on One", another track from I Never Liked You that Drake is featured on, do not "match the toxic king chemistry of their previous collaborations", adding that "like an old rock star who can still play the hits off muscle memory, Drake and Future recite the same stories of one-night stands, DM debauchery and drug-filled nights at the club in their sleep" and "however, their charisma is notably absent from the music". In a similar review, Alphonse Pierre of Pitchfork said that the sample of "Higher" by Tems "is a cheat code to a catchy song, but Future and Drake are on such autopilot that I'd rather listen to the original".

== Music video ==
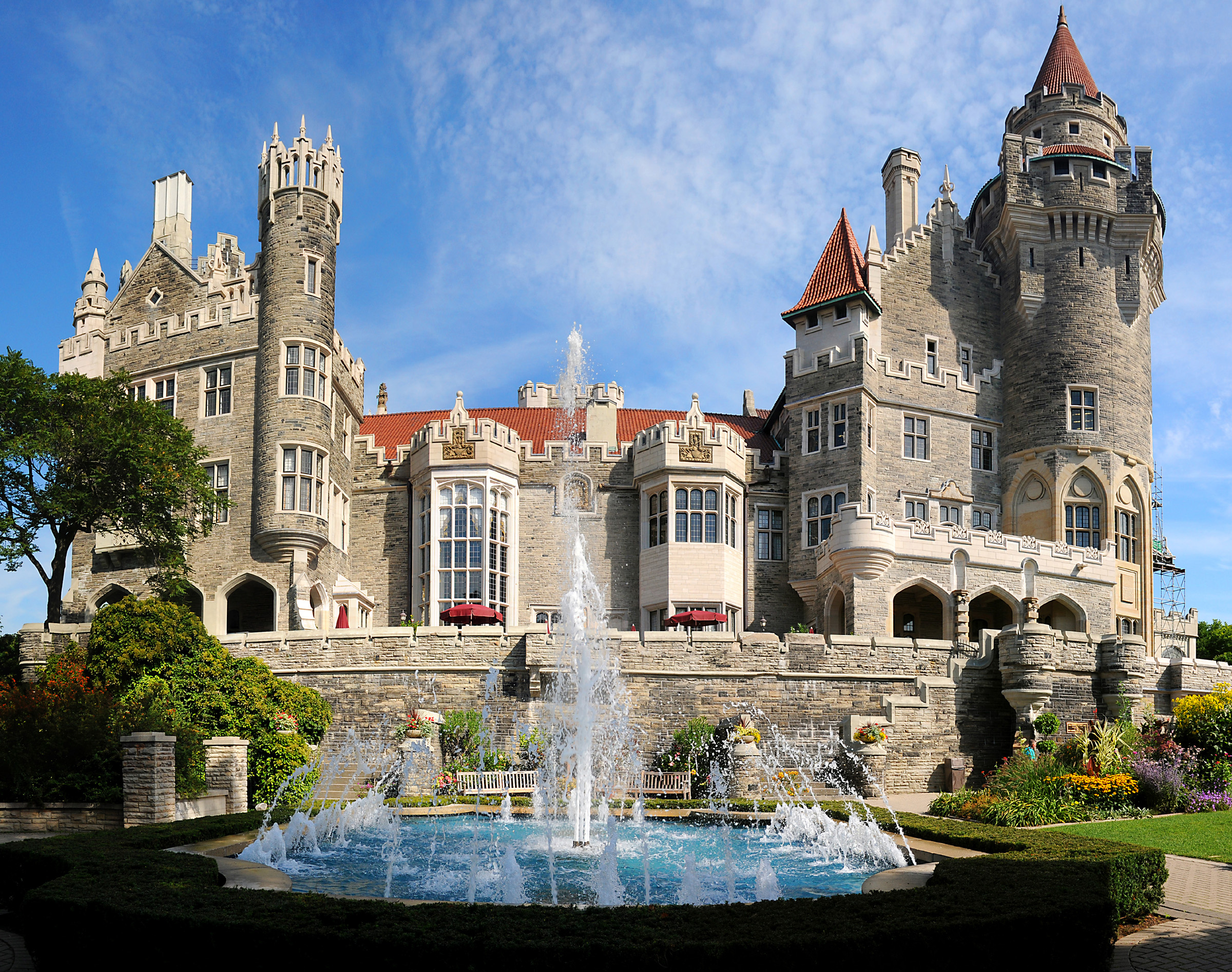
The video was filmed at the Gothic Revival castle-style mansion Casa Loma in Toronto.

The official music video for "Wait for U", directed by Director X, was released on May 5, 2022. It is a medieval-themed video that deals with love and betrayal. The video includes cameo appearances from Moxie Raia, Cecilia Rose, producer ATL Jacob, Strick, and Trey Richards. Drake plays a knight that delivers a note to a queen for Future, who plays a "toxic" king. On the way to deliver the note, Drake engages in a sword fight and saves a woman. At the end of the video, Future wins a duel against another man as the queen reads his note, rolls her eyes and throws it away. Future's note is a reference to a leaked text exchange of his from 2018 in which he told a woman he did not want to see her. The music video was filmed at Casa Loma in Toronto, Canada.

== Credits and personnel ==
- Future – lead vocals, songwriting
- Drake – featured vocals, songwriting
- Tems – featured vocals, songwriting
- FnZ
  - Finatik – production, songwriting
  - Zac – production, songwriting
- ATL Jacob – production, songwriting
- Wheezy - production, songwriting
- Sonic Major - production, songwriting
- Tejiri Akpoghene - songwriting
- Floyd E. Bentley III - songwriting
- Ethan Stevens – mixing
- Joe LaPorta – mastering
- Eric Manco – recording

== Charts ==
=== Weekly charts ===
Weekly chart performance for "Wait for U"
Chart (2022)	Peak position
Australia (ARIA)	12
Austria (Ö3 Austria Top 40)	65
Canada Hot 100 (Billboard)	3
France (SNEP)	135
Germany (GfK)	77
Global 200 (Billboard)	2
Greece International (IFPI)	21
Iceland (Tónlistinn)	11
Ireland (IRMA)	21
Lithuania (AGATA)	28
Netherlands (Single Top 100)	59
New Zealand (Recorded Music NZ)	7
Nigeria (TurnTable Top 50)	18
Nigeria (TurnTable Top 50 Airplay)	11
Portugal (AFP)	68
Slovakia (Singles Digitál Top 100)	78
South Africa Streaming (TOSAC)	1
Sweden Heatseeker (Sverigetopplistan)	1
Switzerland (Schweizer Hitparade)	34
UK Singles (Official Charts)	8
UK Hip Hop/R&B (Official Charts)	4
US Billboard Hot 100	1
US Hot R&B/Hip-Hop Songs (Billboard)	1
US Pop Airplay (Billboard)	20
US Rhythmic Airplay (Billboard)	1

=== Year-end charts ===
2022 year-end chart performance for "Wait for U"
Chart (2022)	Position
Australia (ARIA)	55
Canada (Canadian Hot 100)	36
Global 200 (Billboard)	44
New Zealand (Recorded Music NZ)	38
UK Singles (OCC)	48
US Billboard Hot 100	11
US Hot R&B/Hip-Hop Songs (Billboard)	2
US Rhythmic (Billboard)	3

2023 year-end chart performance for "Wait for U"
Chart (2023)	Position
Global 200 (Billboard)	144
US Billboard Hot 100	83

== Certifications ==
Certifications for "Wait for U"
Region	Certification	Certified units/sales
Australia (ARIA)	2× Platinum	140,000^{‡}
Austria (IFPI Austria)	Gold	15,000^{‡}
Canada (Music Canada)	2× Platinum	160,000^{‡}
Denmark (IFPI Danmark)	Platinum	90,000^{‡}
France (SNEP)	Gold	100,000^{‡}
Italy (FIMI)	Gold	50,000^{‡}
New Zealand (RMNZ)	3× Platinum	90,000^{‡}
Nigeria (TCSN)	2× Platinum	200,000^{‡}
Poland (ZPAV)	Gold	25,000^{‡}
Portugal (AFP)	2× Platinum	50,000^{‡}
Spain (Promusicae)	Gold	30,000^{‡}
United Kingdom (BPI)	2× Platinum	1,200,000^{‡}
United States (RIAA)	11× Platinum	11,000,000^{‡}
^{‡} Sales+streaming figures based on certification alone.

== Release history ==
Release history for "Wait for U"
Region	Date	Format	Label	Ref.
United States	May 3, 2022	Rhythmic contemporary radio	Freebandz; Epic	
Italy	May 6, 2022	Radio airplay	Freebandz; Epic	

== Awards and nominations ==
Award and nominations for "Wait for U"
Year	Ceremony	Award	Result	Ref.
2022	African Entertainment Awards USA	Best Collaboration	Nominated	
2022	American Music Awards	Collaboration of the Year	Nominated	
2022	American Music Awards	Favorite Hip-Hop Song	Won	
2022	BET Hip Hop Awards	Song of the Year	Nominated	
2022	BET Hip Hop Awards	Best Collaboration	Won	
2022	BET Hip Hop Awards	Best Hip Hop Video	Nominated	
2022	MTV Video Music Awards	Song of Summer	Nominated	
2022	MTV Video Music Awards	Best Hip Hop	Nominated	
2023	Grammy Awards	Best Rap Song	Nominated	
2023	Grammy Awards	Best Melodic Rap Performance	Won	
2023	BET Awards	Best Collaboration	Won	
2023	BET Awards	Viewer's Choice	Nominated	
2023	iHeartRadio Music Awards	Best Collaboration	Nominated	
2023	iHeartRadio Music Awards	Favorite Hip-hop Song	Won	
2023	NAACP Image Awards	Outstanding Hip Hop/Rap Song	Nominated	
2023	NAACP Image Awards	Outstanding Duo, Group or Collaboration (Contemporary)	Nominated	
