= Tems =

Nigerian singer (born 1995)

- Tems in 2026

Background information
- Born: Temilade Openiyi; 11 June 1995 (age 31); Lagos, Nigeria
- Genres: Afrobeats; R&B; Alté
- Occupations: Singer; songwriter; record producer
- Instruments: Vocals; keyboards
- Works: Discography
- Years active: 2018–present
- Labels: Since '93; RCA; Leading Vibes
- Awards: Full list
- Website: leadingvibe.com

Temilade Openiyi (/tɛmz/; born 11 June 1995), known professionally as Tems, is a Nigerian singer, songwriter, and record producer. She rose to prominence after being featured on Wizkid's 2020 single "Essence", which peaked at number 9 on the Billboard Hot 100 chart following the release of the remix version with Justin Bieber. The song earned her a Grammy Award nomination. That same year, she was featured on the song "Fountains" by Canadian rapper Drake.

In 2020, Tems released her debut extended play (EP), For Broken Ears. She signed with RCA Records to release her second EP, If Orange Was a Place (2021). In 2022, Tems' vocals from her song "Higher" were sampled by Future on his single "Wait for U", which led to her being credited as a guest artist alongside Drake. The song debuted atop the Billboard Hot 100, making her the first African artist to have a song debut at No. 1 and second Nigerian artist to have a song reach No. 1 at all. The song earned her the Grammy Award for Best Melodic Rap Performance. Tems covered Bob Marley's "No Woman, No Cry" for the Black Panther: Wakanda Forever soundtrack in July 2022 and in the same month, her song "Free Mind" (from her debut EP) debuted on the Billboard Hot 100, peaking at number 46 and breaking the female record for longest charting number one song on R&B/Hip-Hop Airplay chart. She also co-wrote and rendered background vocals on the song "Lift Me Up" by Rihanna, which earned her nominations for the Academy Award for Best Original Song, the Golden Globe Award for Best Original Song and the Grammy Award for Best Song Written for Visual Media.

In 2024, Tems released her debut studio album Born in the Wild to critical acclaim. The album reached the top 30 in the Netherlands, Switzerland and in the United Kingdom, where it peaked at number 24. She embarked on her ongoing Born in the Wild Tour, a supporting world tour. Tems won a Grammy Award from three nominations at the 67th Annual Grammy Awards: her song "Love Me JeJe" won Best African Music Performance, while Born in the Wild was nominated for Best Global Music Album and its third single "Burning" was nominated for Best R&B Song. Tems became the first Nigerian artist with multiple Grammy Awards. In 2026, Tems earned her first number-one single of the UK Singles Chart with "Raindance" along side Dave. The song subsequently earned her six Billboard Hot 100 entry

Throughout her career, Tems has received several accolades, including two Grammy Awards, a Billboard Women in Music Award, four NAACP Image Awards, four BET Awards and three Soul Train Music Awards. As of 2025, Tems has sold over 25 million certified units worldwide, including 12 million RIAA certified units.

== Early life and education ==
Tems was born on 11 June 1995, in Lagos, Nigeria. Her first name Temilade means "the crown is mine" in Yoruba; she is of Yoruba ethnicity. Her family relocated to the United Kingdom when she was an infant, then returned to Nigeria following her parents' divorce, when she was five years old. Tems resided in Ilupeju before moving to Lekki and later Ajah. She attended Dowen College for her secondary education and Monash South Africa for her tertiary education, where she obtained a degree in economics.

In high school, she was frequently bullied because of her voice. At 11 years old, she joined her school choir and soon began singing in falsetto but was noticed by her music teacher who coached her and taught her how to play the piano. Tems often practiced singing with her brother, who often accompanied her on guitar.

== Career ==
=== 2018–2021: Career beginnings and extended plays ===
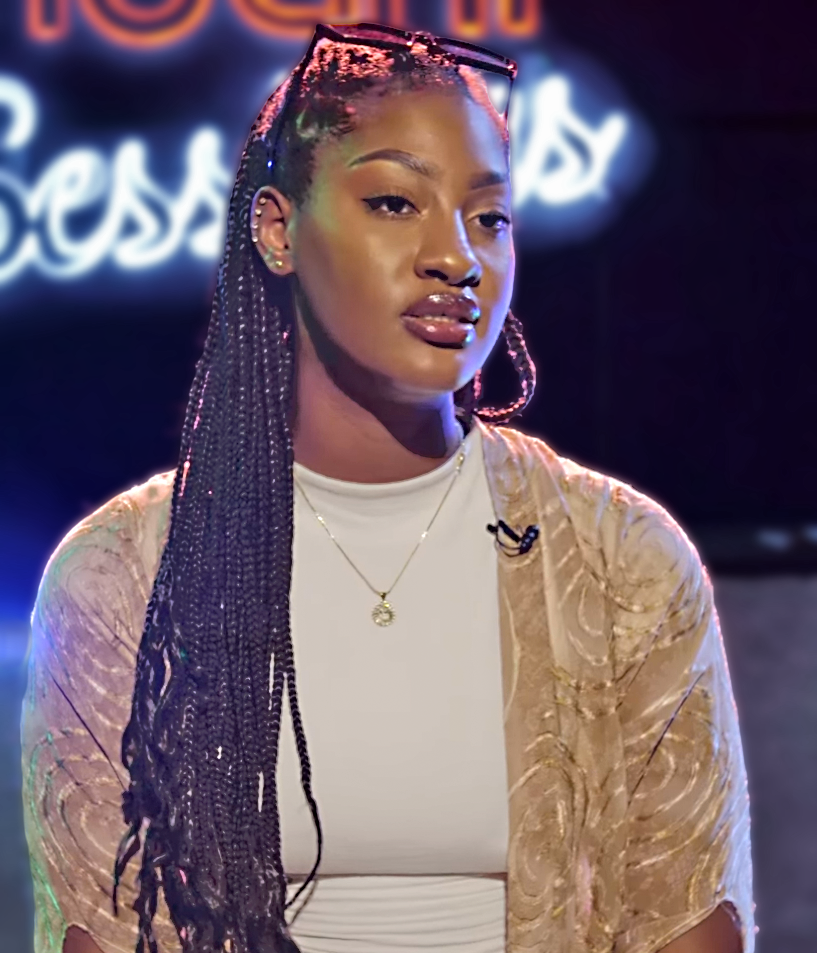
Tems in 2019

In 2018, Tems quit her job in digital marketing to pursue a career in music. She began to learn self production skills on YouTube and on July 18th, 2018, she released her debut single, "Mr Rebel", a song which she produced by herself. On 7 August 2019, she released the single "Try Me". In 2020, DJ Edu chose her as one of "ten artists to watch" that year. On 23 April 2020, Tems was featured alongside fellow Nigerian singer Davido on a reworked version of American singer-songwriter Khalid and English electronic music duo Disclosure's single, "Know Your Worth".

On 25 September 2020, Tems released her debut extended play, For Broken Ears. It was produced primarily by her and the single "Damages" from the EP became another follow up hit to "Try Me", peaking at number one on the Nigerian Apple Music chart and number six on the then-newly launched TurnTable Top 50 chart and garnering five million views on YouTube. On 30 October 2020, Tems was featured on fellow Nigerian singer Wizkid's single, "Essence", from the latter's fourth studio album, Made in Lagos. The song earned her a number one spot on BBC 1Xtra Airplay Chart. and also earned her first career entry on Billboard Hot 100 at number 9. Tems won a Soul Train Music Awards, two NAACP Image Awards, and received a Grammy Award nomination for Best Global Music Performance. On 8 November 2020, Tems was included in The Future Awards Africa: Class of 2020.

On 13 August 2021, a reworked version of "Essence", which contains an additional feature from Canadian singer Justin Bieber, was released, which propelled the song to reach number nine on the Billboard Hot 100. On 3 September 2021, Tems was featured on Canadian rapper and singer Drake's song, "Fountains", from the latter's sixth studio album, Certified Lover Boy, which debuted at number 26 on the Hot 100. On 15 September 2021, Tems released her second extended play, If Orange Was a Place, after being signed to RCA records. It was primarily produced by GuiltyBeatz, and the single "Crazy Tings" was released five days before and peaked at number three on the UK Afrobeats Singles Chart. Later, Tems reached number one on the Billboard Next Big Sound chart and the Billboard Emerging Artists chart.

=== 2022–2023: Breakthrough ===
On 31 March 2022, Apple Music 1 Launched Leading Vibe Radio Show With Tems. On 2 April, its first episode features an appearance from Muyiwa Awoniyi, and Tunji Balogun. On 29 April 2022, Tems was featured alongside Drake on American rapper Future's single, "Wait for U", from the latter's ninth studio album, I Never Liked You. The song debuted atop the Hot 100, making Tems the first African female artist to top the chart and more so debut atop the chart. The song samples the song "Higher" from For Broken Ears.

In July 2022, Tems covered Bob Marley's "No Woman, No Cry" for the Marvel movie Black Panther: Wakanda Forever soundtrack which she was credited alongside Rihanna. On 26 July, Tems gained her fourth Hot 100 with her song "Free Mind" from For Broken Ears which debuted on the chart peaking at number 44 and number 1 on the U.S. Afrobeats song chart. It earned her her first platinum and silver solo certification in the United States and United Kingdom. In July 2022, Tems was announced as a guest artist on Beyoncé's album Renaissance, collaborating on the song "Move" with Grace Jones, becoming her fifth entry on the Hot 100. In October 2022, she co-wrote Rihanna's song "Lift Me Up" for the Black Panther: Wakanda Forever soundtrack. In November 2022, Tems won the Best New Artist at the 2022 Soul Train Music Awards. In the same year, Tems was announced as the top Afrobeats artist on Billboard Year-End U.S. Afrobeats Songs of 2022.

Ludwig Göransson, Rihanna, Ryan Coogler, and Tems were nominated at the 2023 Golden Globe Awards for "Best Original Song — Motion Picture" for "Lift Me Up" from the film Black Panther: Wakanda Forever. It also earned her nominations for the Academy Award for Best Original Song, and the Grammy Award for Best Song Written for Visual Media, making Tems the first Nigerian singer to be nominated in the categories. In February 2023, Tems headlined the Afrobeats themed halftime show at the 2023 NBA All-Star Game. In the same month, Future, Drake, and Tems won the Grammy Award for Best Melodic Rap Performance for "Wait for U". Thus, it marks the first female Nigerian artiste to win a Grammy Award. Tems won the Female MVP award at the Soundcity MVP Awards, which were held at the Eko Convention Centre in Lagos in February 2023. In May 2023, Tems was invited to fashion's biggest night out, the Met Gala. She became the first female Afrobeats artist to attend the event. Furthermore, Tems was listed on the 2023 Time 100 Next list

On 5 October 2023, Tems released the single "Me & U". The song marks Tems's first solo output since If Orange Was a Place, excluding her cover of Bob Marley's "No Woman, No Cry" which was released in 2022. "Me & U" peaked at number 1 on the UK Afrobeats Singles Chart and number 34 on the UK Singles Chart while in the United States, it reached number 10 on Billboard Bubbling Under Hot 100 chart. "Me & U" received an award for Outstanding International Song at the 55th NAACP Image Awards and a BET Award for Dr. Bobby Jones Best Gospel/Inspirational Award. On 5 December 2023, Tems announced that her second single of the year "Not an Angel" would be released on 8 December.

=== 2024–present: Born in the Wild ===
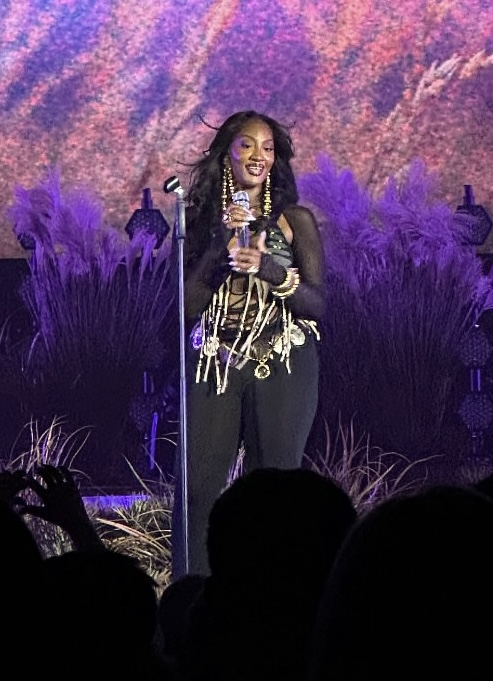
Tems performing at South by Southwest London in 2025

In March 2024, Tems became the first African singer to be awarded a Billboard Women in Music Award in which she received under the Breakthrough category. Tems's debut studio album Born in the Wild was released on 7 June and will be supported by a world tour. The second single "Love Me JeJe" off the album was announced and previewed on Tems's debut Coachella set and was released on 25 April. Tems further appeared on The Tonight Show Starring Jimmy Fallon and on NPR Tiny Desk Concert to promote the album performing the then unreleased songs from the album.

The album was a commercial success, reaching the top thirty in the UK, Netherlands and Switzerland. In the US, it peaked at fifty six becoming the highest peak for an album by a Nigerian female artist. Tems began her ongoing Born in the Wild Tour in June.

Tems received the highest nomination for an African act at the 67th Annual Grammy Awards, earning three nominations: Born in the Wild for Best Global Music Album, "Burning" for Best R&B song and won "Love Me JeJe" for Best African Music Performance . Tems became the first Nigerian artist to win multiple Grammy Awards.

In 2025, Tems became the first African woman to have part ownership in a Major League Soccer team by joining the San Diego FC ownership group. In October, Dave and Tems released “Raindance", the song became a viral hit earning Tems her first number one hit in the UK and subsequently her highest charting song in several countries.

She surprise released her Love is A Kingdom EP on November 21, 2025. She released What You Need from the EP, earning her 7th Billboard Hot 100 entry. She performed the song at the 2026 BET Awards.

== Artistry ==
Tems' mother only allowed her to listen to Christian music as a child. In her teenage years, she became interested in R&B and hip hop, and began listening to artists such as Burna Boy, Lauryn Hill, Adele, Rihanna, Coldplay, Paramore, and Asa. She also listened to Destiny's Child, Beyoncé, Lil Wayne, Mary J Blige, and Aaliyah, and once covered Alicia Keys' 2004 single, "If I Ain't Got You" in a live performance. Tems named Aaliyah, Frank Ocean's "Swim Good", and Lauryn Hill's "I Gotta Find Peace of Mind" as formative inspirations during that period, describing Hill's song as "very, very spiritual". She expressed how the music of those artists helped her understand how songs can channel emotion, provide spiritual connection, and serve as a means of pure self-expression.

At the age of 15, she stopped listening to other artists in search of her own identity, because she "wanted to learn how to attack a song from what I was feeling, not what Beyoncé would do or anyone else".

Her voice has been described as deep, velvety.

== Discography ==
Studio albums

- Born in the Wild (2024)

Extended plays

- For Broken Ears (2020)
- If Orange Was a Place (2021)
- Love Is a Kingdom (2025)

== Tours ==
Headlining

- Born in the Wild Tour

== Awards and nominations ==
Tems has received many accolades, including two Grammy Awards, a Billboard Women in Music Award, four NAACP Image Awards, four BET Awards and three Soul Train Music Awards.
