= Free Mind =

Single by Tems

from the EP For Broken Ears
- Released: 9 August 2022
- Genre: R&B
- Length: 4:07
- Label: Leading Vibes
- Songwriter: Temilade Openiyi
- Producers: Tems; Omeiza

Tems singles chronology
"No Woman, No Cry" (2022)	"Free Mind" (2022)	"Me & U" (2023)

"Free Mind" is a song by Nigerian singer and record producer Tems. It first appeared on 25 September 2020 as the third track from Tems's debut extended play, For Broken Ears. Tems wrote and produced the song alongside co-producer Omeiza. The song debuted on 2 April 2022 at number 5 on the then newly launched Billboard U.S. Afrobeats Songs chart.

"Free Mind" peaked at number 1 on the US Afrobeats chart in late June, and in October 2022, the song reached number 46 on the Billboard Hot 100. It impacted US rhythmic contemporary radio as a single on August 9, 2022.

== Composition ==
The Native wrote that "Free Mind" begins with "soft piano keys and a thumping bass" and its "catchy, self-produced (alongside Omeiza) beat sets the foundation for Tems' honest confessional. With recurring bass after every four bars, one will find themselves bopping their head to the bounce and in agreement with what she's saying in unison." Pulse.ng found that Tems "sings about doubt, fear and the mental strains of tough situations. It basically feels like a diary entry by the mentally strained. But instead of succumbing, she embraces the peace that comes with a 'Free Mind.'"

== Critical reception ==
In review for The Native, Tami Makinde wrote "On the groovy standout "Free Mind", she mulls over thoughts of escapism trying to navigate life with a clouded mind." In review for Pulse Nigeria, Motolani Alake said in his final thought on "Free Mind", Motolani says: This way, Tems could have told a story of self, her manifesto, a short love story, and personal tales of empowerment for downtrodden. Another flaw of Tems’ use of her vocal range - it might feel non-explorative and singular to some finicky listeners.

== Commercial performance ==
On 4 November 2021, Tems performed a live version of "Free Mind" at Tiny Desk Concerts. "Free Mind" debuted at number 90 on the US Billboard Hot 100 on 25 July 2022. On 21 June 2022, "Free Mind" reached number one on the US Afrobeats Songs chart. It also debuted at number 5 on the US R&B Songs chart, and reached number 1 on Mainstream R&B/Hip-Hop Airplay. "Free Mind" debuted at number 28 on Hot R&B/Hip-Hop Songs, and number 22 on R&B/Hip-Hop Airplay, where it hit #1 after 33 weeks, becoming only the second song to ever do so. It reached number 60 on the South African Local & International Streaming Chart Top 100, in the 23rd week of 2022.

== Charts ==
=== Weekly charts ===
Weekly chart performance for "Free Mind"
Chart (2022–2023)	Peak position
South Africa Streaming (TOSAC)	60
US Billboard Hot 100	46
US Afrobeats Songs (Billboard)	1
US Hot R&B/Hip-Hop Songs (Billboard)	12
US R&B/Hip-Hop Airplay (Billboard)	1
US Rhythmic Airplay (Billboard)	10

=== Year-end charts ===
2022 year-end chart performance for "Free Mind"
Chart (2022)	Position
US Afrobeats Songs (Billboard)	4
US Hot R&B/Hip-Hop Songs (Billboard)	27

== Certifications ==
Certifications for "Free Mind"
Region	Certification	Certified units/sales
Canada (Music Canada)	Platinum	80,000^{‡}
New Zealand (RMNZ)	Platinum	30,000^{‡}
United Kingdom (BPI)	Gold	400,000^{‡}
United States (RIAA)	2× Platinum	2,000,000^{‡}
^{‡} Sales+streaming figures based on certification alone.

== Release history ==
Release history for "Free Mind"
Region	Date	Format	Label	Ref.
United States	August 9, 2022	Rhythmic contemporary radio	Leading Vibes; RCA	
United States	February 7, 2023	Urban contemporary radio	Leading Vibes; RCA	
