= 18th Headies Awards =

Nigerian music industry awards

- Date: 10-11 April 2027
- Location: Toronto, Canada
- Country: Nigeria
- Hosted by
- Most awards
- Most nominations: Fola (10)
- Website: theheadies.com

Television/radio coverage
- Network: HipTV

The 18th Headies Awards are scheduled to be held on 10-11 April 2027. Organized by the Headies Academy, the ceremony will honor outstanding achievements in the Nigerian and African music industries during the eligibility period. The event is themed "Africa to the World". The ceremony will be held in Toronto, Canada.

== Nominees ==
Below is the list of nominees for the popular music categories, which were reviewed between 1 August 2024 and 30 April 2026.

Song of the Year	Afrobeats Single of the Year
"Arike" – Kunmie; "Hey Jago" – Poco Lee, Shoday & Rahman Jago; "Hot Body" – Ayra Starr; "Joy is Coming" – Fido; "MMS" – Asake (featuring Wizkid); "With You" – Davido (featuring Omah Lay)	"Fun" – Rema; "Jogodo" – Wizkid & Asake; "Laho" – Shallipopi; "With You" – Davido (featuring Omah Lay); "You" – Fola; "Bundle by Bundle" – Burna Boy
Album of the Year	Afrobeats Album of the Year
Catharsis – Fola; Clarity of Mind – Omah Lay; G.O.A.T – Erigga; Morayo – Wizkid; The Machine is Coming – Odumodublvck; This One is Personal – Tiwa Savage; No Sign of Weakness – Burna Boy	5ive – Davido; Captain – Bnxn; Clarity of Mind – Omah Lay; Fuji – Adekunle Gold; Morayo – Wizkid; No Sign of Weakness – Burna Boy
Best Recording of the Year	Best Collaboration
"Arike" – Kunmie; "How Do You?" – Amaeya; "Baby (Is it a Crime)" – Rema; "Coping Mechanism" – Omah Lay (featuring Elmah); "With You" – Davido (featuring Omah Lay}; "You" – Fola	"Body (danz)" – CKay (featuring Mavo); "Escaladizzy" – Mavo (featuring Wave$tar); "Hey Jago" – Poco Lee, Shoday & Rahman Jago; "Lost" – Fola (featuring Kizz Daniel); "Pity This Boy" – Odumodublvck (featuring Victony); "With You" – Davido (featuring Omah Lay); "See What We've Done" – Mr Eazi & King Promise; "Finally" – Chief Priest (featuring Spyki); "99" – Olamide (featuring Young Jonn, Asake, Seyi Vibez, and Daecolm)
Best Rap Album	Best Rap Single
Black Sheepizen (The 13th Disciple) – Tuff King; GE3 (The Beginning) – A-Q; G.O.A.T – Erigga; King – Jeriq; No Excuses – Blaqbonez; The Machine is Coming – Odumodublvck	"2:02 PM in London" – Odumodublvck; "ACL" – Blaqbonez; "Man2Man" – Dremo; "Moshood" – PDSTRN; "Nkemakonam" – Tuff King; "Wuse Tu" – Zaylevelten & Mavo; "John Wick" – Zhus Jdo
Best R&B Album	Best R&B Single
Before We Became Strangers – Kunmie; Catharsis – Fola; I Am the Blueprint – Qing Madi; Love Is a Kingdom – Tems; Reflection Station – Tay Iwar; This One is Personal – Tiwa Savage	"6:35" — Layefa; "How Do You?" — Amaeya; "I Love You” — Amma; "What You Need" — Tems; "Winter & Summer" — Magixx; "You4Me" — Tiwa Savage
Best Street-Hop Artiste
Famous Pluto – "Na Scra"; Kashcoming – "All My Money"; Poco Lee – "Hey Jago" (with Shoday and Rahman Jago); Seyi Vibez – "Shaolin"; Shallipopi – "Laho"; Tuff King – "Nkemakonam"; Rybeena – "Gaddem" (featuring Shoday)
Best Vocal Performance (Female)	Best Vocal Performance (Male)
Layefa – "6:35"; Amaeya – "How Do You?"; Ṣẹwà – "Lagos Lovin'"; Qing Madi – "Scumbag"; Liya – "Skin to Skin"; Tiwa Savage – "You4Me"	Adekunle Gold – "I'm Not Done"; Flavour – "Orente"; Magixx – "Winter & Summer"; Odeal – "Patience"; Syemca – "Love Egbugomo"; Tay Iwar – "Bad Belle"
Best Male Artiste	Best Female Ariste
Adekunle Gold; Asake; Fola; Mavo; Rema; Wizkid; Burna Boy	Ayra Starr; Qing Madi; Ṣẹwà; Tems; Teni; Tiwa Savage
Next Rated	Best Performer (Live)
Fido; Fola; Llona; Mavo; Shoday	Adekunle Gold – Live at the National Theatre, Lagos; Asake — Red Bull Symphonic; Ayra Starr — Global Citizen Festival 2025; Johnny Drille — Johnny’s Room Live 6; Ruger — Live at Indigo at The O2, London (2025)
Music Video of the Year (Note: This particular accolade is awarded to the video director.)	Producer of the Year
Director Pink – "10 Kilo"; Dammy Twitch – "With You"; TG Omori – "Afroculture"; Jyde Ajala – "Wizard Chan"; Director K – "Bundle by Bundle"; Meji Alabi – "Who's Dat Girl"	Magicsticks – "Jogodo" and Real, Vol. 1; P.Priime – "MMS", "Baby (Is it a Crime)" and "Billionaires Club"; Ragee – "Hot Body" and "Who's Dat Girl"; Sarz – "Getting Paid", "Uhh Yeahh" and "C'mon Look!"; Tempoe – "With You" and "SMH"
Songwriter of the Year	Lyricist on the Roll
Adekunle Kosoko – "Many People"; Anthony Victor – "Cough Syrup" (with Bnxn); Fuayefika Maxwell – "Time Traveler"; Afolarin Odunlami – "Who Does That?"; Oluwabukunmi Peter – "Arike"; Peace Amaefula — "How Do You?"	Blaqbonez – "ACL"; Dremo – "Man2Man"; Mode 9 – "If You Like Gym" (with Odumodublvck); PDSTRN – "Moshood"; Ycee – "Man2Man" (Remix) (with Dremo)
Headies Viewers' Choice	Digital Artiste of the Year
"Hot Body" – Ayra Starr; "With You" – Davido (featuring Omah Lay); "Baby (Is it a Crime)" – Rema; "You" – Fola; "Jogodo" – Wizkid & Asake; "Arike" – Kunmie; "Escaladizzy" – Mavo (featuring WAVE$TAR)	Asake; Ayra Starr; Bnxn; Chella; Fola; Mavo; Seyi Vibez; Wizkid
Rookie of the Year	International Artiste of the Year
Amma; Danpapa GTA; Firstklaz; Kidd Carder; No11; Priesst; OG Abbah	Ciara; Dave; Gunna; Jazmine Sullivan; Shenseea; Tiakola
Best West African Artiste of the Year	Best East African Artiste of the Year
Black Sherif (Ghana); Himra (Ivory Coast); KiDi (Ghana); King Promise (Ghana); Moliy (Ghana); Wally B. Seck (Senegal); Stonebwoy (Ghana)	Abigail Chams (Tanzania); Bien (Kenya); Bruce Melodie (Rwanda); Harmonize (Tanzania); Joshua Baraka (Uganda)
Best North African Artiste of the Year	Best Southern African Artiste of the Year
Balti (Tunisia); Dystinct (Morocco); Marwan Moussa (Egypt); Soolking (Algeria); Tul8te (Egypt)	Ciza (South Africa); DJ Maphorisa (South Africa); Jazzwrld (Lesotho); Kabza de Small (South Africa); Tyla (South Africa); Uncle Waffles (South Africa)
Best Central African Artiste of the Year	Best Inspirational Single
Fally Ipupa (Democratic Republic of the Congo); Ferré Gola (Democratic Republic of the Congo); Héritier Watanabe (Democratic Republic of the Congo); Hiro (Democratic Republic of the Congo); Innoss'B (Democratic Republic of the Congo); Locko (Cameroon)	"Amioluwa" – Sunmisola Agbebi (featuring Yinka Okeleye); "Favour" – Lawrence Oyor; "Idinma (You Are Good)" – Sinach; "Korin Iyin (I Will Praise You)" – EmmaOMG; "No Turning Back 2" – Gaise Baba (featuring Lawrence Oyor); "We Move" – Mercy Chinwo
Best Original Song for Visual Media	African Diaspora Canadian Artiste
"All My Love" – Osas Okonyon & Abbey Wonder (Evi); "Behind the Scenes" – Funke Akindele & Tolu Obanro (Behind the Scenes); "Save Me" – Oscar Heman-Ackah & 2Baba (To Kill a Monkey); "Only in Lagos" – Wurld & Liya (Christmas in Lagos)	Debby Friday - "Lipsync"; Tôme - "CC" (featuring Alpha P); Bolu Ajibade – "Diana" (with Friyie); Nonso Amadi – "Dive In"; Rooky Kamiz – "Deeper"; Tobi – "Out the Mad"
Best Alternative Song	Best Alternative Album
"CYK Baddie" – Luwa.mp4 (featuring Jeleel); "Lagos Lovin'" – Ṣẹwà; "Oliver" – Wizard Chan; "Omo To Sexy" – Binde; "Prada Baby" – Wave$tar; "Sweet Danger" – Obongjayar; "Summer Adina" – Chief Priest (featuring BoyPee and Zoro Swagbag)	Afrika Magik - Show Dem Camp; Detox - Ṣẹwà; Duplicity – BOJ; Heales Chapel – Wizard Chan; Olorin Pack – Scottyolorin; Then 1t Got Crazy – Zaylevelten
Special Recognition	Hall of Fame
Cecil Hammond	Awilo Longomba
