= List of number-one songs of 2026 (Nigeria) =

The TurnTable Top 100 (formerly known as TurnTable Top 50) is the official music chart for Nigeria, published weekly by TurnTable magazine. The chart ranks the most popular songs in the country based on a combination of streaming and airplay data. Streaming accounts for 50% of the chart, sourced from platforms including Apple Music, Spotify, Boomplay, Audiomack, YouTube, and Deezer, with paid streams weighted more heavily than ad-supported streams. Airplay, which also accounts for 50% of the chart, is tracked via Radiomonitor and includes both radio and television plays across Nigeria.

"Jogodo" by Asake and Wizkid is the longest-running number-one single of 2026 so far, having led the Top 100 for multiple consecutive weeks. As of the chart dated 16 April, seven artists have reached number one during the year, with Asake earning the most total weeks in the position. Wizkid ranks second through his featured appearance on "Jogodo", while DJ Snake, Ckay, Shoday, and Fola have also topped the chart.

== Chart history ==
Issue Date	Song	Artist(s)	Ref.
1 January	"Body (danz)"	Ckay featuring Mavo	
8 January	"Body (danz)"	Ckay featuring Mavo	
15 January	"Paparazzi"	Shoday and Fola	
22 January	"Jogodo"	Asake and Wizkid	
29 January	"Jogodo"	Asake and Wizkid	
5 February	"Jogodo"	Asake and Wizkid	
12 February	"Jogodo"	Asake and Wizkid	
19 February	"Jogodo"	Asake and Wizkid	
26 February	"Jogodo"	Asake and Wizkid	
5 March	"Jogodo"	Asake and Wizkid	
12 March	"Jogodo"	Asake and Wizkid	
19 March	"Jogodo"	Asake and Wizkid	
26 March	"Worship"	Asake and DJ Snake	
2 April	"Worship"	Asake and DJ Snake	
9 April	"Worship"	Asake and DJ Snake	
16 April	"Worship"	Asake and DJ Snake	
23 April	"Worship"	Asake and DJ Snake	
30 April	"Back Outside"	Bnxn and Sarz	
7 May	"Gratitude"	Asake	
14 May	"Forgiveness"	Asake	
21 May	"Forgiveness"	Asake	
28 May	"Chanel"	Blaqbonez featuring Asake	
4 June	"Chanel"	Blaqbonez featuring Asake	
11 June	"Chanel"	Blaqbonez featuring Asake	
18 June	"Chanel"	Blaqbonez featuring Asake	
25 June	"Forgiveness"	Asake	
2 July	"I Know Who I Be"	Davido, JAZZWRLD and GL Ceejay	
9 July	"Treat U Right"	Fola featuring Ayra Starr	

== Number-one artists ==
List of number-one artists by total weeks at number one
Position	Artist	Weeks at No. 1
1	Asake	22
2	Wizkid	9
3	DJ Snake	5
4	Blaqbonez	4
5	Ckay	2
5	Mavo	2
6	Shoday	1
6	Fola	1
6	Bnxn	1
6	Sarz	1
6	Davido	1
6	JAZZWRLD	1
6	GL Ceejay	1

== See also ==
- List of number-one songs in Nigeria
