= Camisa 10 =

Studio album by Ronaldinho
- Released: June 9, 2026
- Genres: Dancehall; reggaeton; Latin pop; Regional Mexican; Afrobeats; urban
- Label: Tu Música

Camisa 10 is the debut studio album credited to the Brazilian former footballer Ronaldinho. It was released on June 9, 2026, as the first project issued through Tu Música, a Miami-based music company and record label that Ronaldinho launched earlier the same year. The album was conceived as a collaborative release built around international guest artists, and was timed to the period leading up to the 2026 FIFA World Cup.

== Background and release ==
Tu Música is a Miami-based record label and music platform, first reported by Billboard in March 2026. Camisa 10 was announced as the label's inaugural release on June 3, 2026, reporting a release date of June 9, ahead of the 2026 FIFA World Cup. According to the label, the project was developed by the businessmen Allan Jesus and Roni Maltz Bin together with Roberto de Assis, Ronaldinho's brother and longtime manager.

The album's title refers to the number 10 shirt Ronaldinho wore the number during his career with the Brazil national football team, FC Barcelona and other clubs.

== Content ==
The album brought together 44 artists from 18 countries, including the United States, Mexico, Colombia, Argentina, Venezuela, Brazil, Nigeria, Spain, France, the United Kingdom and Jamaica, spanning genres such as dancehall, reggaeton, Latin pop, regional Mexican music, Afrobeats, piseiro, and urban music. The Jamaican dancehall artist Sean Paul was described as leading the project, appearing on its lead track. Other featured artistes include Jonas Blue, Justin Quiles, Luis R. Conriquez, Lenny Tavárez, Shoday, Gyakie, Odumodublvck, Skales, Mavo, Dalex, Micro TDH, Jon Z, and Yng Lvcas, among others.
