= Catharsis (Fola album) =

2025 studio album by FOLA

Studio album by FOLA
- Released: 4 September 2025
- Genres: Afrobeats; Afropop; R&B
- Length: 28:05
- Labels: Dangbana Republik; Empire

FOLA chronology
What a Feeling (2024)	Catharsis (2025)

Singles from Catharsis
- 1. "Lost" Released: 24 April 2025; 2. "You" Released: 7 August 2025; 3. "Eko" Released: 1 September 2025

Catharsis (stylized in all lowercase) is the debut studio album by Nigerian singer-songwriter FOLA. It was released on 4 September 2025 by Dangbana Republik, and Empire. The studio album production credit are: L.O.L., Sbthaproducer, Shallythechampion, Kel-P, KTIZO Hoodini, Chuma Nwokike, Harrison Song, Adam Fritzle, Josh Milligan, Damie, Jhay2unez, and Promise.

== Background ==
In 2024, Bella Shmurda unveils FOLA as Dangbana Republik new signee. On 2 December 2024, in an interview with TurnTable, he announced his debut EP what a feeling to be released in the same year, which became a commercial success and would pave the way for his next project. On 15 August 2025, he announced plans to release his debut studio album.

== Singles ==
"Lost" was released on April 24, 2025, featuring Kizz Daniel, as the first single from the album. "You" was released on 7 August 2025, as the second single of the album. "Eko" was released on 1 September 2025, as the third single of the album.

== Critical reception ==
Professional ratings
Review scores
Source	Rating
Pulse Nigeria	7.1/10
African Folder	7.6/10
The Upper Entertainment	8.7/10

Catharsis received generally favorable reviews from music critics. In a review for Pulse Nigeria, Adeayo Adebiyi says: "Fola’s run by expanding on the sound that brought him fame. His reluctance to embrace some variety and adventure leads to a predictability that can create dullness even for a 28-minute album."

African Folder's Philemon Jacob describes the album as "is a clear stamp in the incredible moment Fola is having, a breakout year that would be remembered fondly in history."

In review for The Upper Entertainment, Bomi Anifowose describes the album as "An imperfect, brilliant, and necessary debut that expands Afrobeats’ emotional vocabulary."

=== Accolades ===
Year	Awards ceremony	Award description(s)	Results	Ref
2026	The Headies	Album of the Year	Pending	
2026	The Headies	Best R&B Album	Pending	

== Track listing ==
No.	Title	Length
1.	"Gokada"	1:43
2.	"Eko"	2:54
3.	"Golibe" (with Victony)	2:42
4.	"You"	2:45
5.	"Lost" (with Kizz Daniel)	2:48
6.	"Healer"	2:35
7.	"Cruise Control"	2:00
8.	"Robbery" (with Gabzy)	2:44
9.	"Caricature"	3:01
10.	"Disco" (with Young Jonn)	2:13
11.	"It's Going"	2:40
Total length:		28:05

=== Notes ===
- All songs are stylized in all lowercase

== Charts ==
Chart performance for Catharsis
Chart (2025)	Peak position
Nigerian Albums (TurnTable)	1
