= Julie Adenuga =

British radio presenter

- Born: Julie Oluwatoyin Chidozie Adenuga; 1987 or 1988 (age 37–38); Tottenham, London, England
- Occupations: DJ; Radio personality
- Years active: 2010–present
- Known for: Don't Trust the Internet; Presenter and executive producer of Now You Know with Julie Adenuga (2025)
- Relatives: Skepta (brother); Jme (brother); Jason Adenuga (brother)
- Presenting career
- Country: United Kingdom
- Website: julieadenuga.com

Julie Oluwatoyin Chidozie Adenuga (born 1987 or 1988) is a British broadcaster, radio host and the creator of Don't Trust The Internet.

== Early life ==
Adenuga was born Julie Oluwatoyin Chidozie Adenuga in Tottenham, in the London Borough of Haringey, to Nigerian parents. Her father Joseph Adenuga is from the Yoruba ethnic group while her mother Ify Adenuga is from the Igbo ethnic group. Adenuga is the younger sister of Jme and Skepta, who are both London-based Grime artists and record producers, as well as co-founders of the Boy Better Know record label. She also has a younger brother: Jason Adenuga, an animator.

== Early career ==
Adenuga made her debut in the music industry in 2010, when she joined London community radio station Rinse FM and then went on to present the drive time show.

In 2014, she created and hosted a music television show on Channel AKA and Dailymotion called Play It, which serves as a platform for UK rap and grime artists as well as singers and poets. Adenuga recently started a YouTube interview series, featuring artists such UK grime and rap artist Stormzy. As well as this, she hosted Vice Magazine's online offshoot, Noisey's, Grime Karaoke.

As part of the 2015 Apple WWDC keynote, Adenuga was introduced as the London headline host of Beats 1 radio. Beats 1 is the global radio service from Apple Music.

To add to her presenting accolades, Adenuga wrote and presented Skepta's 'Greatness Only' documentary for Noisey. Her talents have been noted and recognised with mentions in Forbes 2017 Europe 30 under 30, in Debrett's 500 List: Music.

In 2020, Adenuga launched Don't Trust the Internet (DTTI), a creative media house that produces shows such as Julie's Top 5.

In early 2021, she began co-hosting MTV's Catfish UK: The TV Show, the UK version of the U.S. show, alongside Oobah Butler. Adenuga left the show after only one season.

== Selected interviews ==
Julie Adenuga has conducted interviews with rappers, singer-songwriters, record producers, authors and creatives including Stormzy, Jay-Z, Jorja Smith, Pharrell Williams, Skepta, Wizkid, Cruel Santino, Cardi B, Kojo Funds, Burna Boy, Erykah Badu, Snazzy the Optimist, Billie Eilish, Megan Thee Stallion, Grace Ladoja, Greatness Dex, Wavy the Creator, Not3s, Candice Carty-Williams, Odunsi the Engine, Stefflon Don, Ify Adenuga, Big Narstie, Mr Eazi, and Ghostpoet.
