= Oseremen =

Given name

- Gender: Unisex
- Language: Igbo

Origin
- Meaning: 'God has done well'
- Region of origin: Nigeria

Oseremen is a unisex given name from the Edo people of southern Nigeria. It means 'God has done well' or 'God has done good.' The name expresses gratitude to God.

== Person with the name ==
- Mavo (musician), stage name of Oseremen Marvin Ukanigbe, Nigerian singer-songwriter
