= Batife Bentley =

Nigerian influencer

- Born: Ameera Eniola Adelekan; September 14, 2004 (age 22); Lagos, Nigeria
- Other name: Batife
- Occupations: Choreographer; content creator; Internet personality; actress
- Years active: 2018–present

Instagram information
- Page: Batife Bentley
- Years active: 2018–present
- Followers: 340,000

TikTok information
- Page: Batife Bentley
- Years active: 2018–present
- Genres: Dance; lifestyle; fashion
- Followers: 1.7 million
- Last updated: May 2026

Ameera Eniola Adelekan (born 14 September 2004), known by her online pseudonym Batife Bentley or simply Batife is a Nigerian social media personality, actress, choreographer, content creator, and fashion influencer. She rose to prominence during the COVID-19 pandemic lockdown of 2020, known for creating viral dance challenges tied to Nigerian pop releases.

== Early life ==
Ameera Eniola Adelekan was born in Lagos State, Nigeria on September 14, 2004. but she comes from Ogun state. Adelekan studied Political Science and Education, from Tai Solarin University of Education (TASUED) in Ijebu-Ode.

== Career ==
Batife Bentley first gained prominence as a dancer in 2014 on facebook when she appeared on the song "Atewo" by DJ Zeez featuring Olamide.

Bentley created her TikTok account in 2018, mainly posting content centered on dance videos and fashion. Her online presence grew during the COVID-19 pandemic. During this time, she began producing a series of trend-based dance challenges on the platform, incorporating lip-syncing and choreography to Nigerian Afrobeats artists. Among the musicians for whom she created associated dance challenges were Spyro, Shoday, Adekunle Gold, and Don Jazzy.

In 2023, Bentley starred in YouTube web series High School Magical produced by Sir Balo, in which she portrayed the character Batife, a mind reader. She was featured on the birthday tribute single "Queen N More"(2024), a collaborative track with recording artist Shoday.

In 2025, she co-directed her debut short film, Bon Fire (2025), in which she also starred, portraying Fatima, a National Youth Service Corps (NYSC) corps member. Reviewing Bon Fire, New Telegraph praised her character. That year, Bentley starred in Funke Akindele comedy drama film on Behind The Scenes (2025). That same year, Bentley was included on the Ranks Africa Magazine Top 100 Brands list under the Inflencers category. Bentley has appeared in several comedy skits alongside Nigerian content creators, including Taaooma, Mr Macaroni, and Sydney Talker. She received a nomination at the 8th edition of The Emperor Awards. Bentley has been referenced in musical recordings by various artists.

In 2026 She was Featured on the song "Mr Barry". On May 28, 2026, Everton F.C. posted a highlight video of Thierno Barry's goals on Instagram using her TikTok sound "Mr. Barry" in the background.

== Discography ==
=== Singles ===
==== As lead artist ====
List of singles as lead artist, with selected chart positions
Title	Year	Peak chart positions		Certifications	Album
Title	Year	NG	UK Afro	Certifications	Album
"Queen N More" (with. Shoday)	2024	—	—	TCSN: Silver	Non-album single
Mr Barry (with. Omo Ebira)	2026	—	—	—	Non-album single

== Songs written ==
Key
‡	Indicates song written solely by Ameera Batife Adelekan
†	Indicates song features an uncredited vocal contribution by Ameera Batife Adelekan
•	Indicates song features a credited vocal or featured artist contribution by Ameera Batife Adelekan

Song	Artist(s)	Writer(s)	Year	Peak chart positions		Ref.
				NGA	US Afro.	
"Move"	Shoday	Shodade Solomon Segun; Ameera Batife Adelekan	2026	15	41	

== Filmography ==
=== Film ===
Year	Title	Role	Note
2025	Behind The Scene	Herself	Film
2024	Bon Fire	Fatima	Short Film

=== Television ===
Year(s)	Title	Role	Network	Note
2023–present	High School Magical	Batife	Webseries	19 episodes

=== Live performances and events ===
Event	Year	Notes
Soundcity TV University Tour	2026	Live performance appearance

=== Music videos ===
Year	Title	Performer(s)
2024	"Queen N More"	Shoday, Batife

== Listicle ==
Publisher	Year	Listicle	Result	Ref.
Afrocritick	2024	Afrocritik's 2024 Top 100 African Songs	87th	
Ranks Africa Magazine	2025	Top 100 Most Impactful Brand Influencers in Africa	Honored	
YNaija	2026	100 Nigerian Digital Creators Defining Culture	95th	

== Awards and nominations ==
Year	Award	Category	Result	Ref.
2025	The Achievers Awards International	TikTok Influencer of the Year.	Nominated	
2025	The Emperor Awards	Influencer of the Year.	Nominated	
2025	Ranks Africa Magazine Awards	Brand Influencer of the Year.	Won	
