= Street Souk =

Annual fashion convention

- Status: Active
- Genre: Streetwear
- Date: December
- Frequency: Annual
- Location: Lagos
- Country: Nigeria
- Years active: 2018–present
- Founder: Iretidayo Zaccheaus
- Website: streetsouk.com

Street Souk is an annual fashion convention in Lagos, Nigeria, founded in 2018 by Iretidayo Zaccheaus, as a community to celebrate Africa's upcoming and most influential streetwear brands. The convention is a melting pot for fashion, music, entertainment, and streetwear culture. It is one of Africa's largest streetwear conventions drawing considerable media attention internationally.

== History ==
Street Souk was founded in 2018 to bring together the best of streetwear culture in Nigeria. Its convention is supported by The NATIVE Networks, Jameson Irish Whiskey, First Bank of Nigeria, Pocket by Piggyvest, MTN Nigeria, Power Horse, TrybeOne and Eventful Limited. Street Souk also serves as the official fashion curator for Our Homecoming music festival. In 2022, Street Souk hosted its first pop-up event in London, to give African brands the opportunity to showcase their brands. It has collaborated with local and international streetwear's including Off-White, Daily Paper, NBDA, Places + Faces, WafflesnCream, Vivendii and Motherlan.

=== Editions ===
The 2018 inaugural event was hosted in Lagos and presented 40 designers with 1,500 attendees. The 2019 sophomore event became groundbreaking for the festival and presented 60 designers including Mowalola Ogunlesi, Rahman Jago, and Yinka Ash. In 2020, its third edition presented 80 streetwear brands includes WafflesnCream, Vivendii, FreeTheYouth, and 555 Opulence.

In 2021, Street Souk presented 100 designers to celebrate upcoming and most influential streetwear brands. In 2022, its fifth edition partnered with Pocket by Piggyvest, MTN Nigeria, Power Horse, and TrybeOne. On 10 February 2023, Jameson Irish Whiskey and Iretidayo Zaccheaus celebrated the 5th anniversary of Street Souk fashion convention with a limited streetwear clothing brand.
