= Ireti =

- Gender: Female/Male
- Language: Yoruba

Origin
- Origin: Nigerian
- Meaning: Hope; Expectance; Anticipate
- Region of origin: South-West Nigeria

Ìrètí audiois a Nigerian given name of Yoruba origin, which means "Hope", "expectance". Ireti is most commonly a diminutive form of "Iretioluwa" (or Iretiolu) which means The expectance from God,("Olú" means Lord, Leader, or the "Prominent one," in the Yoruba language). Other full forms of the name include "Iretiola" (expecting wealth), "Iretiayo"(expecting joy).

Notable people with the name include:

- Ireti Kingibe, Nigerian civil engineer and politician
- Ireti Osayemi, Nigerian actress
- Iretiola Doyle, Nigerian actress
- Iretidayo Zaccheaus, British-Nigerian fashion entrepreneur
