= Campfire (disambiguation) =

A campfire is a fire at a campsite.

Campfire or Camp Fire may also refer to:

== Arts and entertainment ==
- Campfire (James Blundell album) (2017)
- Campfire (Kasey Chambers album) (2018)
- Campfire (Rend Collective album) (2012)
- "Campfire", a song by Red Velvet from the 2015 album The Red
- "Campfire", a song by DRAM and Neil Young from the soundtrack of 2017 film Bright
- Campfire (film) or Medurat Hashevet, a 2004 Israeli film

== Other uses ==
- Camp Fire (2018), a wildfire in Butte County, California, U.S.
- Camp Fire (organization), an American co-ed youth development organization
- Campfire (horse), an American Thoroughbred racehorse
- Campfire (software), an online chat service by Basecamp
- Campfire (app), a companion app to connect with players of Niantic games
- Communal Areas Management Programme for Indigenous Resources (CAMPFIRE), in Zimbabwe
- Campfire, a platform around which internet tribes gather

== See also ==
- Bonfire (disambiguation)
- Campfire songs (disambiguation)
- Campfire Girls (band)
- Camp Fire Girls (novel series)
