= Chella =

Chella can refer to:

== Places ==
- Serra de chella (or Serra de Chela), mountain range in south-central Angola
- Vaikunda Chella Pathi, one among the oldest Nizhal Thangals in the Western Kanyakumari district, India
- Chella (mountains), a range of mountains in Angola
- Chella, Valencia, a municipality known as Xella in Valencian

== People ==
- Chella Choi (born 1990), South Korean professional golfer
- Chella Man (born 1998), American YouTuber, actor, model, and artist
- Chella Pillai, a 1955 Indian Tamil-language comedy-drama film by M. V. Raman
- Chella (singer) (born 2000), Nigerian singer-songwriter

== Others ==
- Chilla-nashini, a Sufi practice of penance and solitude
- Chellah (also known as Sala), a complex of ancient and medieval ruins on the outskirts of Rabat, Morocco
