= Bonfire (disambiguation) =

A bonfire is a large, controlled outdoor fire. It may also refer to:

== Music ==
- Bonfire (band), a German heavy metal band
- Bonfire (AC/DC album), a 1997 5 disc box set
- Bonfire (The Shires album), 2026
- "Bonfire" (Childish Gambino song), 2011
- "Bonfire" (Craig Morgan song), 2009
- "Bonfire" (Felix Jaehn song), 2016
- "Bonfire", a song by The Hunna
- "Bonfire", a song by Knife Party from Rage Valley
- "Bonfire", a song by Third Eye Blind from Ursa Major

== Video games ==
- Bonfire Studios, a video game company in Dallas, Texas
- Bonfire (Dark Souls), a type of checkpoint in the Dark Souls series

== Other ==
- Bonfire Snowboarding, a manufacturer of snowboarding outerwear
- Bonfire Ventures, American venture capital company
- Aggie Bonfire, a tradition at Texas A&M University
- Bonfire (horse), a prizewinning dressage horse ridden by the Dutch equestrian Anky van Grunsven

== See also ==
- Bon Fire, 2025 short film
- Campfire (disambiguation)
- Campfire Songs (disambiguation)
