= Shoday =

Nigerian singer-songwriter

- Born: Shodade Solomon Segun; 2000 (age 25–26); Lagos
- Origin: Ogun State, Nigeria
- Genres: Afropop; Afrobeat; Amapiano; Dancehall
- Occupations: Singer; Songwriter
- Years active: 2012–present
- Labels: 5K Records; Canny Consults; Sony Music Entertainment UK

Shoday (born Shodade Solomon Segun), is a Nigerian Afrobeat singer, and songwriter, currently signed to Canny Consults and 5K Records, a subsidiary of Sony Music UK. He rose to fame with his debut single, "Caution", which earned him his first ever TCSN Nigeria Gold certification. He gained international recognition with his 2026 single "Paparazzi", with fola, which peaked at number 1 on the Nigeria Top 100, peaked at number 7 on the U.S. Afrobeats chart, and peaked at number 12 on the UK Afrobeats chart.

== Early life ==
Shodade Solomon Segun was born and raised in Lagos, but hails from Ogun State. His first name, Shodade, means "the sorcerer has a crown on" in Yoruba; he is of Yoruba ethnicity. He studied Building Technology at YABATECH.

== Career ==
On 31 October 2021, Shoday released "Dey4you" independently. On 26 January 2022, he released "For You" independently through Azuri. The song was co-signed by Don Jazzy during its first week of release. On 10 August 2022, he released "Caution" through Yung Musik Empire. In the same year, he began making videos featuring his songs "Dey4you", "Sweet Year" and "Caution" and posting them daily until they went viral, as a content creator on TikTok. "Caution" became his breakout single and earned him his first chart entry on the Nigeria Top 100 on 31 October 2022, at number 89. On 5 December 2022, on the TurnTable Nigeria Top 100, "Caution" peaked at number 38.

On 1 December 2022, Shoday released "Caution (remix)" featuring Skiibii. On 11 January 2023, TurnTable magazine listed Shoday, as one of the 14 Artistes to Watch Out for in 2023, following the viral success of his song "Caution". On 3 February 2023, he released "Maradona", which peaked at 94 on the Nigeria Official Top 100. On 16 February 2024, he released his first extended play BRKFST, which featured Bella Shmurda. A week after his EP was released, Apple Music announced him as its Up Next artiste. On 21 June 2024, he released "Casanova", independently through The Orchard. On 14 September 2024, he released "Queen N More", featuring Batife, through CiDAR Africa.

On 24 October 2024, Shoday released "Casablanca", featuring Ayo Maff, which peaked at 22 on the Nigeria Official Top 100. On 12 December 2024, he released "Kolorado", featuring Billionboi. On 30 January 2025, he released "Blessings (Alubarika)", featuring Soundz, which peaked at 54 on the Nigeria Official Top 100. On 28 February 2025, he released "Screaming Beauty" with OliveTheBoy, which peaked at 53 on the Nigeria Top 100. On 19 March 2025, he joined Poco Lee, and Rahman Jago on "Hey Jago", which peaked at 16 on the Nigeria Top 100. On 15 April 2025, he released "PURR" with Ayo Maff, which peaked at 74 on the Nigeria Top 100.

On 20 April 2025, Shoday opened for Davido at Our Homecoming. On 15 August 2025, he released "Shoday Kilode", which peaked at 61 on the Nigeria Top 100. On 9 October 2025, he joined Joeboy on "Ring", which peaked at 61 on the Nigeria Top 100. On 17 October 2025, he released "A1" featuring Kizz Daniel, which peaked at 97 on the Nigeria Top 100. On 28 October 2025, he charted with "Gaddem" at number 3, and "Sweet" at number 8 on the TikTok Nigeria's Songs of the Summer chart. On 28 November 2025, he joined TxC and Mavo on "Welele". On 6 December 2025, Multichoice Nigeria announced Shoday to perform at the GOtv Boxing Night Jam festival to be held in Lagos at TBS.

On 12 December 2025, he joined TxC, Davido, and Scotts Maphuma on "Nakupenda", featuring Zlatan and AI Xapo which peaked at number 3 on the Nigeria Top 100. In 2025, Shoday, alongside Wande Coal, Zlatan, and DJ Neptune, was on the headline of Goldberg's Golden Xmas concert, held on 13 December 2025 in Ibadan. On 16 December 2025, Coke Studio Africa, announced Shoday, Asake, Rema, Central Cee, DJ Tunez and many more, on its line-up on the upcoming season of Coke Studio titled "We Outside", with release date yet to be announced. On 19 December 2025, he joined Nektunez, Tiwa Savage, and Ciza on "Baddi Ah", featuring Mega EJ, P.M.F, and Tripcy.

On 2 January 2026, Shoday released "Paparazzi" with FOLA. On 5 January 2026, "Paparazzi" debuted at number 3 on the Nigeria Top 100 and peaked at number 1 the following week. On 13 January 2026, "Paparazzi" debuted at number 7 on the Billboard U.S. Afrobeats Songs chart. On 17 January 2026, "Paparazzi" debuted at number 12 on the UK Afrobeats Singles Chart. Later that day, during the third-place match of the 2025 Africa Cup of Nations between Egypt and Nigeria, Goldberg Lager hosted a live viewing event in Lagos at the Lion Wonder Arena. The event, titled Goldberg's Festival of Drums and Light, featured performances by Shoday and Small Doctor.

On 29 January 2026, Shoday announced his forthcoming album HYBRID, to be released on 6 February 2026, through 5K Records, Sony Music UK, and Canny Consults.

== Discography ==
=== Extended plays ===
List of extended plays, with selected details and chart positions
| Title | Details | Peak chart positions | Certification |
| Title | Details | NGR | Certification |
|---|---|---|---|
| BRKFST | Released: 16 February 2024; Label: Independent; Formats: Digital download, streaming | — | |

=== Studio albums ===
List of studio albums, with selected chart positions
| Title | Album details | Peak chart positions | | | | Certification |
| Title | Album details | NGR | UK | US | US World | Certification |
|---|---|---|---|---|---|---|
| HYBRID | Released: 6 February 2026; Label: 5K Records, Canny Consults, Sony Music UK; Formats: Digital download, streaming | 4 | — | — | — | |

=== Singles ===
==== As lead artist ====
List of charted singles, with selected chart positions
| Title | Year | Peak chart positions | | | | | Certifications | Album |
| Title | Year | NG | UK | US | UK Afro | US Afro | Certifications | Album |
|---|---|---|---|---|---|---|---|---|
| "Dey4you" | 2021 | — | — | — | — | — | | Non-album single |
| "Sweet year" | 2021 | — | — | — | — | — | | Non-album single |
| "For You" | 2022 | — | — | — | — | — | | Non-album single |
| "Hadiza" | 2022 | — | — | — | — | — | | Non-album single |
| "Caution" | 2022 | 38 | — | — | — | — | TCSN: Gold | Non-album single |
| "Caution (remix)" (with SKiibii) | 2022 | — | — | — | — | — | | Non-album single |
| "Maradona" | 2023 | 94 | — | — | — | — | | Non-album single |
| "Self Respect(freestyle)" | 2023 | — | — | — | — | — | | Non-album single |
| "Melanin" | 2023 | — | — | — | — | — | | Non-album single |
| "You" | 2023 | — | — | — | — | — | | Non-album single |
| "My baby (freestyle)" | 2023 | — | — | — | — | — | | Non-album single |
| "Girls Hostel" | 2024 | — | — | — | — | — | | Brkfst |
| "Casanova" | 2024 | — | — | — | — | — | | Non-album single |
| "Queen N More" (with. Batife) | 2024 | — | — | — | — | — | TCSN: Silver | Non-album single |
| "Casablanca" (feat. Ayo Maff) | 2024 | 22 | — | — | — | — | TCSN: Gold | HYBRID |
| "Kolorado" (with. Billionboi) | 2024 | — | — | — | — | — | | Non-album single |
| "Blessings (Alubarika)" (feat. Soundz) | 2025 | 54 | — | — | — | — | | Non-album single |
| "Screaming Beauty" (with. OliveTheBoy) | 2025 | 53 | — | — | — | — | | HYBRID |
| "PURR" (with. Ayo Maff) | 2025 | 74 | — | — | — | — | | Non-album single |
| "Shoday Kilode" | 2025 | 61 | — | — | — | — | | HYBRID |
| "A1" (with. Kizz Daniel) (2025) | 2025 | 97 | — | — | — | — | | HYBRID |
| "Nakupenda" (with. TxC, Davido & Scotts Maphuma, feat. Zlatan & AI Xapo) | 2025 | 3 | — | — | 8 | — | | TBA |
| "Paparazzi" (with. FOLA) | 2026 | 1 | — | — | 7 | 12 | | HYBRID |

==== As featured artist ====
List of charted singles as featured artist, with selected chart positions
| Title | Year | Peak chart positions | | | | | Certifications | Album |
| Title | Year | NG | UK | US | UK Afro | US Afro | Certifications | Album |
|---|---|---|---|---|---|---|---|---|
| "FINEE" (Bj Show feat. Shoday & Wxze music) | 2024 | 63 | — | — | — | — | TCSN: Silver | Non-album single |
| "Competition" (Nationn feat. Shoday) | 2025 | 74 | — | — | — | — | | Non-album single |
| "Hey Jago" (Poco Lee & Shoday feat. Rahman Jago) | 2025 | 16 | — | — | — | — | | Non-album single |
| "Face My Fears (The Majeek feat. Shoday & Camidoh) | 2025 | 53 | — | — | — | — | | The Majeekcian (Vol. 1) |
| "Sweet" (Spyro feat. Shoday) | 2025 | 66 | — | — | — | — | | The Men, The Boys and Your Guy |
| "Gaddem" (with. Rybeena) (2025) | 2025 | 16 | — | — | — | — | | Mr Bee |
| "Bobo" (with. Adekunle Gold & Lojay) | 2025 | 14 | — | — | — | — | | Fuji |
| "Ring" (Joeboy feat. Shoday) | 2025 | 34 | — | — | — | — | | TBA |

== Concerts and festivals ==
=== Co-headlining ===
- GOtv Boxing Night Jam festival – 2025
- Goldberg's Golden Xmas concert (with Wande Coal, Zlatan, and DJ Neptune) – 2025
- Goldberg's Festival of Drums and Light (with Small Doctor) – 2026

=== Supporting ===
- Our Homecoming (with Davido) – 2025
