= Iretidayo Zaccheaus =

Nigerian fashion entrepreneur

Ireti Zaccheaus
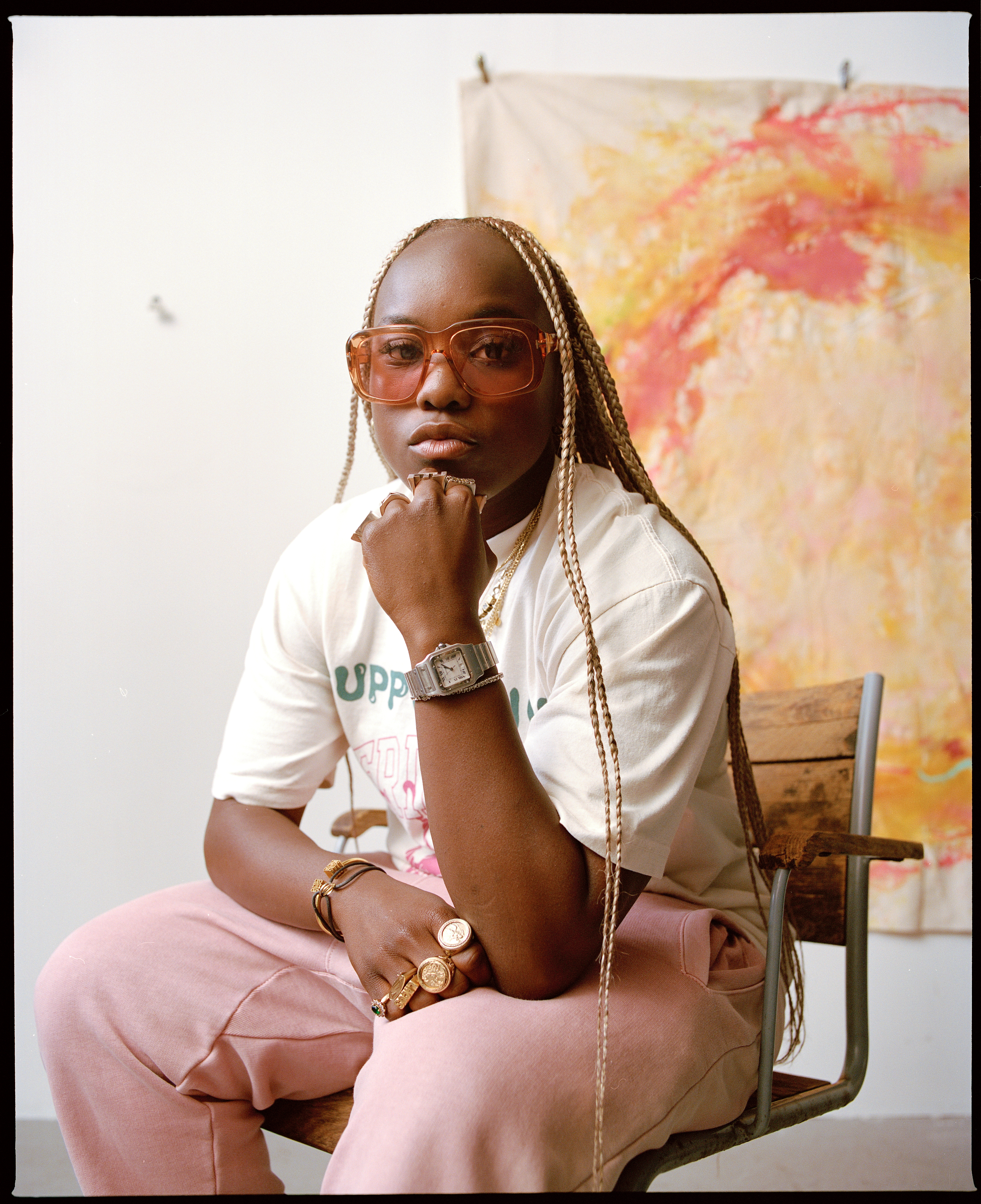
- Born: Iretidayo Morenikeji Zaccheaus; Lagos
- Citizenship: Nigerian
- Education: University of Manchester; Cass Business School
- Occupation: Fashion entrepreneur
- Years active: 2018–present
- Known for: Street Souk
- Parents: Teni Zaccheaus Sr. (father); Yewande Zaccheaus (mother)
- Relatives: Teezee (Brother)

Iretidayo Zaccheaus, mononymously known as Ireti, is a British-Nigerian fashion entrepreneur. She is best known as the creator of Street Souk, an urban fashion convention held in Lagos, Nigeria since 2018. Ireti also serves as the community manager at Metallic Inc, and the fashion curator for Our Homecoming music festival in affiliation with Street Souk.

In 2020, CNN profiled Ireti as one of The young West Africans finding their voice through streetwear. In 2022, Victoria and Albert Museum in collaboration with Nataal Magazine, profiled her as one of the new waves of streetwear coming out of Cape Town and Lagos. On 22 February 2023, The Business of Fashion named Ireti as one of The Gatekeepers to Nigeria's Fashion Market.

== Early life and education ==
Iretidayo Morenikeji Zaccheaus was born in Lagos. She graduated from the University of Manchester in International Business Finance and Economics in 2020, with a master's degree in Marketing Strategy and Innovation at Cass Business School, London. Ireti cited her brother Teezee, and her cousins as one of her earliest inspirations and love for streetwears. In conversation with GUAP, Ireti cited her mom for inspiring her streetwear convention, after she attended her mom's fashion convention in Nigeria.

== Career ==
In 2018, Ireti founded Street Souk, a streetwear convocation co-signed by Virgil Abloh. In the same year, she served as the creative director for The Native limited edition jerseys in partnership with Nike. In 2022, Ireti was on the panel for LFW AW22. On 11 August 2023, Ireti spoke on cross-cultural collaboration at Our Homecoming Festival Building Empowered Narratives Panel Talk.

== Personal life ==
Ireti is the Nigerian record executive Teezee sister.
