= With You (Davido song) =

2025 song by Davido featuring Omah Lay

Song by Davido featuring Omah Lay

from the album 5ive
- Language: English; Pidgin
- Released: 18 April 2025
- Genre: Afrobeats; Igbo highlife
- Length: 2:16
- Label: DMW; Columbia; SME
- Songwriters: David Adedeji Adeleke; Stanley Omah Didia; Jessy Eze Oliver
- Producer: Tempoe

Music video
- "With You" on YouTube

"With You" is a song by Nigerian-American singer and songwriter Davido, featuring Nigerian singer Omah Lay. It was released by Davido Music Worldwide, Columbia Records, and Sony Music Entertainment on 18 April 2025, as the seventeenth track from the former's fifth studio album 5ive. In the United Kingdom, the song debuted at number 4 on the UK Afrobeats Singles chart and peaked atop the TurnTable Hot 100 in Nigeria.

== Background ==
Before its release, the idea of a collaboration between Davido and Omah Lay began after Omah Lay publicly expressed admiration for Davido and confirmed that they had recorded a song together, disclosing that it was scheduled for release in the near future. At the time, Omah Lay also addressed earlier speculations in which he had suggested that he believed Davido disliked him, a misunderstanding that was later resolved. Davido later explained that the collaboration originated from an interaction during a livestream with American streamer Kai Cenat in Lagos, where he played Omah Lay's music and spoke positively about him.

Following the livestream, Omah Lay reacted on social media, expressing surprise at the endorsement and admitting that he had previously assumed Davido disliked him. Davido reached out privately to clarify the situation, which led to further communication and studio sessions between both artists. According to Davido, the two recorded around four songs together and he chose "With You" as the one he liked most and put it on the album. After the release of 5ive, Davido admitted in an interview with Rocsi Diaz that he initially had plans of scrapping the song off the album, but kept it due to it being a "true African classic", expressing satisfaction that it stayed on the album.

== Composition ==
"With You" is rooted in Igbo highlife, with Davido stating that the song was inspired by Bright Chimezie's 1984 track "Because of English". The influence appears in Davido's vocal cadence, phrasing, and chant-like delivery, with commentators noting that Omah Lay's verse also reflects classic highlife elements. The track blends these highlife ideas with modern afrobeats production, built around a repeating guitar loop, synth textures, and a mid-tempo rhythm. Lyrically, the lines referencing struggles with speaking English closely echo Chimezie's original song, prompting debate over whether the song uses direct sampling or functions as an interpolation.

== Music video ==
The music video for "With You" was directed by Dammy Twitch and shot in Lagos. It premiered on 16 June 2025 and surpassed one million views on YouTube within just over 24 hours of release. The video was produced by Polar Films Production and shows Davido and Omah Lay in a party setting with groups of young people dancing and celebrating. Highlife musician Bright Chimezie makes a cameo appearance midway through the video, wearing a cap and white bead necklace while performing dance moves. He appeared in the video after Davido interpolated his song "Because of English," which inspired the track, and performs the same dance moves he did in a viral social media clip of him acknowledging the song. Cubana Chief Priest also makes a brief cameo in the video.

== Critical reception ==
Boluwatife Adeyemi of The Native wrote that its "opening guitar licks were enough to cause delirium in functions across the continent, and its nomination for Best African Music Performance at the 2026 Grammy Awards speaks to its status not just as a fleeting hit but as a significant piece of contemporary African music that resonates on the highest international platforms." Emmanuel Okoro ranked "With You" number 3 on Afrocritik's list of the Top 100 African Songs of 2025. He commended Omah Lay for his "aching delivery" that "sets the emotional temperature," and Davido for being able to "meet him halfway with a measured, almost tender performance that strips back his usual bravado." Okoro further stated that the song was "anchored by a warm, understated production," and that it was "no surprise that this record stands tall in a constellation of releases."

In a review of 5ive also for Afrocritik, Abioye Damilare and Yinoluwa Olowofoyeku said the song captured "the sound of a man in tune with his emotions as a lover boy." Chibuzo Emmanuel of the Culture Custodian said that the song's "exuberant rhythms and festive air function as a charge to savor life’s little pleasures." Adeayo Adebiyi of Pulse Nigeria criticized Omah Lay for "half-mindedly mumbl[ing] through his verse" and added that Davido struggled to fit into the colourful sonic world Tempoe's production demanded." Walden Green of Pitchfork said that "With You" was "livelier and more electrically charged" than the songs preceding it on the album. Quincy of Ratings Game Music said that "the track boasts the album's most infectious instrumental—upbeat, colorful, and full of life—making it a favorite of mine." He praised Omah Lay for "float[ing] effortlessly over the production, sounding almost intoxicated by the rhythm," and stated that "Davido delivers a strong, melodic verse filled with praise for his leading lady." He called their chemistry "undeniable," and concluded that "it's refreshing to see an Afrobeats OG link up with a new-gen favorite in such a seamless, feel-good way."

=== Lists ===
Name of publisher, name of listicle, year(s) listed, and placement result
Publisher	Listicle	Year(s)	Result	Ref.
Afrocritik	Afrocritik's Top 100 African Songs of 2025	2025	3	
Rolling Stone	The 45 Best Afropop Songs of 2025	2025	6	
The Native	Native Mag's Best Songs of 2025	2025	1	

=== Accolades ===
Year	Awards ceremony	Award description(s)	Results
2025	All Africa Music Awards	Song of the Year	Nominated
2025	All Africa Music Awards	Best African Collaboration	Nominated
2026	Grammy Awards	Best African Music Performance	Nominated
2026	Ghana Music Awards	Best African Song	Won
2026	The Headies	Song of the Year	Pending
2026	The Headies	Afrobeats Single of the Year	Pending
2026	The Headies	Best Recording of the Year	Pending
2026	The Headies	Best Collaboration	Pending
2026	The Headies	Music Video of the Year (Dammy Twitch for "With You")	Pending
2026	The Headies	Producer of the Year (Tempoe for "With You")	Pending
2026	The Headies	Viewer's Choice	Pending

== Charts ==
=== Weekly charts ===
Chart performance for "With You"
Chart (2025)	Peak position
Nigeria (TurnTable Top 100)	1
Suriname (Nationale Top 40)	7
UK Singles (Official Charts)	85
UK Afrobeats (Official Charts)	1
UK Hip Hop/R&B (Official Charts)	24
US Afrobeats Songs (Billboard)	5

=== Year-end charts ===
2025 year-end chart performance for "With You"
Chart (2025)	Position
US Afrobeats Songs (Billboard)	8

== See also ==
- List of number-one songs of 2025 (Nigeria)
