= TK Nciza =

South African politician and music executive

Provincial Secretary of the Gauteng African National Congress
- In office June 2022 – February 2025
- Deputy: Tasneem Motara
- Chairperson: Panyaza Lesufi
- Preceded by: Jacob Khawe

Personal details
- Born: Thembinkosi Nciza; 17 December 1975 (age 49); Gugulethu, Cape Province; South Africa
- Political party: African National Congress
- Spouse: Nhlanhla Mafu (m. 2004; div. 2019)
- Children: 4, including Ciza

Thembinkosi "TK" Nciza (born 17 December 1975) is a South African politician, businessman, and former music executive. He rose to prominence as the co-founder of TS Records. He launched his political career in the African National Congress (ANC) in 2014, serving as the party's regional secretary in Ekurhuleni from 2018 to 2022 and then as its provincial secretary in Gauteng from 2022 to 2025.

== Early life ==
Nciza was born on 17 December 1975 in Gugulethu in the former Cape Province. He joined the Congress of South African Students as a teenager in Mpumalanga, and he was later a member of the African National Congress (ANC) Youth League.

== Business career ==
In 2001, Nciza co-founded TS Records, a record label, with Sbusiso Leope, a musician and broadcaster popularly known as DJ Sbu. Until 2005, the label's products were licensed, marketed, and distributed by CCP Records, EMI's South African division. The label's notable early acts included Brown Dash, Izinyoka, Afro-pop singer Ntando, Mzekezeke, and Robbie Malinga. In 2010 it signed Zahara, whom Nciza had personally scouted in East London; she lived with Nciza and his wife for a period. By 2017, the label had been dormant for several years and Leope announced that he and Nciza no longer worked together.

Nciza's other business interests have included co-ownership of companies with Mzwandile Masina, a politician and Nciza's old friend; with Leope, the pair also had shared business interests with politician Panyaza Lesufi.

== ANC career ==
=== Ekurhuleni: 2014–2022 ===
Nciza began his political career in November 2014, when a regional ANC conference elected him as treasurer of the party's influential branch in Ekurhuleni. He was elected alongside Masina, who became chairman of the branch. At the next regional conference in 2018 he was elected as the branch's regional secretary, still serving alongside Masina as chairman; and the regional conference in May 2022 putatively re-elected the pair to those positions, though the result was strongly disputed.

Indeed, in July 2023, the Johannesburg High Court nullified the outcomes of the May 2022 election, finding that several local constituencies had unfairly been excluded from the vote. The court judgment, identifying Nciza by name as "an important antagonist in this case," lent credence to longstanding allegations that Nciza had improperly interfered in the election procedures to exclude opponents from the vote. Although the court ordered that the election should be re-run, Nciza was not affected because he had already left the Ekurhuleni leadership for higher office.

=== Gauteng: 2022–present ===
Weeks after the controversial Ekurhuleni conference, in June 2022, Nciza attended the Gauteng ANC's provincial conference as a candidate for election as the party's provincial secretary. He ran on a slate of candidates allied to Lebogang Maile, who was challenging Panyaza Lesufi for the provincial chairmanship; Maile's provincial faction was viewed as closely aligned to Masina's regional faction in Ekurhuleni. At the conference, Maile lost to Lesufi but Nciza narrowly won the secretariat: he received 534 votes while Thulani Kunene received 525 votes and the incumbent, Jacob Khawe, received only 56. Tasneem Motara, another Maile ally, was elected as deputy provincial secretary under Nciza. Nciza resigned from the Ekurhuleni leadership to take up his new provincial position.

During Nciza's tenure in the leadership, the provincial party confronted declining popularity in both the 2021 local elections and the 2024 general election. In 2022, Nciza and Lesufi led the ANC negotiating team that failed to negotiate a coalition with the Economic Freedom Fighters in the City of Ekurhuleni council; the Daily Maverick reported that Nciza and Lesufi had taken a negotiating stance that was at odds with instructions from the ANC's national leadership.

In February 2025, ostensibly in response to the Gauteng ANC's poor performance in the 2024 election, the ANC National Executive Committee disbanded the leadership corps of the provincial party, installing an interim leadership structure. In what was viewed as a snub, Nciza was not given a leadership position in the so-called task team: Hope Papo was assigned to take over his administrative duties as interim coordinator of the provincial party.

== Personal life ==
Nciza was married to Mafikizolo musician Nhlanhla Mafu between 2004 and 2019, when they divorced. Their five-year old daughter was killed in a car crash in December 2009. They also have three sons, one of whom, Nkululeko, is an Afrobeats musician known professionally as Ciza.

Nciza's brother, Xolani Nciza, is a senior civil servant in Gauteng.
