= Paparazzi (Shoday song) =

2026 single by Shoday & FOLA

Single by Shoday & FOLA

from the album HYBRID
- Released: 2 January 2026
- Genre: Afrobeat; Afropop; Afroswing
- Length: 2:27
- Label: 5K Records; Canny Consults; Sony Music Entertainment UK
- Songwriters: Shodade Solomon Segun; Folarin Odunlami
- Producer: SB

Shoday singles chronology
| "Baddi Ah" (2025) | "Paparazzi" (2026) |

FOLA singles chronology
| "eko" (2025) | "Paparazzi" (2026) |

Music video
- "Paparazzi" on YouTube

"Paparazzi" is a song by Nigerian singer Shoday and FOLA, released on 2 January 2026 through 5K Records, Canny Consults, and Sony Music UK. The single was produced by SB for Canny Consults and 5K Records. The song peaked at number 1 on the Official Nigeria Top 100, peaked at number 7 on Billboard U.S. Afrobeats chart, and debuts at number 12 on the UK Afrobeats chart.

== Background and reception ==
After releasing "Paparazzi" on 2 January, the music video directed by Perliks was released on 3 January 2026.

On 29 January 2026, Shoday announced his forthcoming album HYBRID, to be released on 6 February 2026.

== Critical reception ==
On TheCable's TCL Radio critics' week of 24 January 2026, "Paparazzi" debuts at number 9.

On TheCable's TCL Radio critics' week of 31 January 2026, "Paparazzi" ranked at number 6.

On 9 January 2026, OkayAfrica included "Paparazzi" on its list of Top African Songs You Need to Hear This Week.

"Paparazzi" peaked at number 4 on Cool FM Top 10 playlist of the week.

== Commercial performance ==
On 5 January 2026, it debuted at number three on Nigeria's Top 100 and peaked at number 1 the following week. On 5 January 2026, "Paparazzi" debuts at number 1 on Nigeria's Official Streaming Songs chart. On 13 January 2026, it debuted at number 7 on the Billboard U.S. Afrobeats Songs chart. On 17 January 2026, it debuted at number 12 on the UK Afrobeats Singles Chart. On 19 January 2026, it peaked at number 6 on Nigeria's Official Radio Songs chart.

== Charts ==
Weekly chart performance for "Paparazzi"
| Chart (2026) | Peak position |
|---|---|
| Nigeria Top 100 (TurnTable) | 1 |
| Nigeria Official Radio Songs (TurnTable) | 6 |
| Nigeria Official Streaming Songs (TurnTable) | 1 |
| UK Afrobeats (Official Charts) | 12 |
| US Afrobeats Songs (Billboard) | 7 |
| Nigeria TCL radio (TheCable) | 6 |
