= Zaylevelten =

Nigerian rapper and record producer (born 2002)

- Also known as: Tenski; Aizay
- Born: Chisom Lucky Okoro; 14 August 2002 (age 24); Ikorodu, Nigeria
- Genres: Nigerian hip-hop; Afrobeats; rage
- Occupations: Rapper; songwriter; record producer
- Instrument: Vocals
- Years active: 2020–present
- Labels: Lizzy Records; Antagonist Music

Chisom Lucky Okoro (born 12 August 2002), known professionally as Zaylevelten, is a Nigerian rapper and record producer from Ikorodu. He rose to prominence in 2025 with the release of his third mixtape Then 1t G0t Crazy and its deluxe version, Then 1t G0t Crazier.

== Early life ==
Chisom Lucky Okoro was born on 12 August 2002 in Ikorodu, Lagos State. Okoro is of Igbo descent, and his parents are from Ohaozara, Ebonyi State. He was educated at St. Margaret in Ikorodu for primary school. During secondary school, Okoro attended the Kith and Kin boarding school before being transferred to the day school Tindip during JSS3 due to his bad behavior. Okoro credits being taken out of Kith and Kin to making him the way he is, saying that he likely would not have been making music if he was not transferred out of Kith and Kin. Okoro used to draw as a child. As of March 2025, he attends UNILAG as an English education student.

== Career ==
=== 2021–2023: Career beginnings ===
Okoro began a music career on SoundCloud under the name Aizay in 2021, and released his first song, "Poe Up" on 10 March. His next song was titled "Rich as SHiT". Okoro changed his stage name to Zaylevelten in 2023 due to mispronunciations. In a 2025 interview, he initially stated that he was already called "Zay" and "Level ten", and simply combined the two. Okoro later gave another explanation, saying that "Zay" came from a rapper he used to listen to in his youth, 'ten' as a reference to things that are considered great, and 'level' because he wanted his name to be longer. Zaylevelten credits collaborator Element3 with giving him the name 'Tenski', which he uses as his alter-ego for his producer credits.

=== 2024–2025: Tenski, L0cked 1n, Before 1t G0t Crazy ===
Zaylevelten released the mixtape Tenski in 2024, naming the project so in order to make his Tenski nickname stick. The project is now taken off of streaming platforms, presumably for clearance issues.

On 17 July 2024, Zaylevelten released the EP L0cked 1n. Later that year, he released his first mixtape that's still available on streaming platforms, Bef0re 1t G0t Crazy on 30 October. On 12 February 2025, he released the single "Watching Me", which began gaining traction on the internet.

=== 2025-present: Then 1t G0t Crazy, B4SaveMe ===
"Watching Me" was followed up by the single "Yaad 2" on 2 April and then "Maye", on 29 May. The latter of which further raised Zaylevelten's profile and led to a deal with Lizzy Records and a cosign from Nigerian singer Davido. On 23 July he released the single "Show Me Luv" with British-Nigerian rapper Fimiguerrerro. On 19 September 2025, Zaylevelten released the singles "Pawon" and "Fly". On 28 November 2025, Zaylevelten released his third mixtape, Then 1t G0t Crazy. This was followed up by its deluxe version Then 1t G0t Crazier a month later. This version included the single "Wuse Tu" with Nigerian singer Mavo. Odumodublvck was also featured.

On 13 February 2026, Zaylevelten released the single "Muzz". He then released "Go Again" on 12 June. On 21 July 2026, Zaylevelten released his second EP B4SaveMe, which included the track "Tease Me", which was released as a single on 25 September 2026. On 27 September 2026, it was announced that Zaylevelten would support British rapper Dave during his Nigeria leg of his The Boy Who Played the Harp Tour. On 2 October 2026, Zaylevelten appeared on the track "Lalakula" with Txmmyily and Famous Pluto. On 16 October he appeared on the track "Big Drop" by Cruel Santino alongside OctobersRich.

== Artistry ==
Zaylevelten's music has been described as a mix of rage and trap music of America combined with street-pop sounds of Nigeria. He incorporates English, Nigerian Pidgin, Igbo, and Yoruba languages in his music. Much of Zaylevelten's music is self-produced, with him stating that 70% of Then 1t G0t Crazy's production was his own.

== Controversies ==
=== Carter Efe ===
In May 2026, at the release party for singer Famous Pluto's debut mixtape Street Therapist, streamer Carter Efe attempted to interview Zaylevelten before his team stepped in to prevent it. This led to Carter Efe accusing them of being too prideful. Zaylevelten included a line directed towards Carter Efe on 10 May 2026 with the SoundCloud-exclusive track "Talk Freestyle", with the lyric "Because I dey spit, oh, you go think say I be Carter Efe?" Following the lyric going viral on social media, Zaylevelten said on X, "not a diss e just pain me cuz i love him".

== Discography ==
=== Mixtapes ===
- Tenski (2024)
- Before 1t G0t Crazy (2024)
- Then 1t G0t Crazy (2025)

=== Extended plays ===
- L0cked 1n (2024)
- B4SaveMe (2026)
