= Famous Pluto =

Nigerian singer

- Also known as: Famous
- Born: Osahon Grandeur Uzama; August 14, 2005 (age 21); Benin City, Edo, Nigeria
- Origin: Benin City
- Genres: Afrobeats; afrobeat; amapiano
- Occupations: Singer; songwriter
- Years active: 2015–present
- Labels: Plutomania
- Relatives: Shallipopi (brother); Zerrydl (brother)
- Member of: Plutomanias

Osahon Grandeur Uzama (born August 14, 2005), known professionally as Famous Pluto, is a Nigerian singer and songwriter. Born and raised in Benin City, he signed with Shallipopi's Plutomania Records in 2025, and rose to mainstream fame with the release of his debut single "Na Scra", that same year. Its success led to the release of his debut extended play Uzama The 3rd (2025).

== Career ==
Uzama began his music career in 2015 alongside his elder brothers, Shallipopi and Zerrydl. Initially, he was reluctant to sing, but Shallipopi encouraged him, and he drew inspiration from Wizkid. Uzama began posting freestyles on TikTok in 2020. Uzama gained recognition after being featured on Outsyd DJ's 2024 single "Feel D Mood", which went viral on TikTok and topped the Nigerian TurnTable 100 charts. In 2025, Uzama signed with Plutomania Records and released his debut single "Na Scra", which also debuted at the top of the TurnTable Charts. Later, he collaborated on the remix of Zhus Jdo's single "1 WORK" alongside Smur Lee. On June 20, 2025, Uzama released his debut extended play Uzama The 3rd, featuring Shallipopi, Zerrydl, and Jeriq.

In May 2026, Famous Pluto released his debut studio album, Street Therapist, through Plutomania Records and ONErpm. The 11-track album featured guest appearances by Zlatan, Mavo, Zaylevelten, Muyeez, Zerrydl and Brazy.

== Discography ==
=== Studio albums ===
- Street Therapist

=== EPs ===
List of extended plays, with selected details
Title	Details
Uzama The 3rd	Released: June 20, 2025; Label: Plutomania, ONErpm; Formats: Digital download, streaming

=== Singles ===
- "Na Scra" (2025)
