= Ayüü =

Nigerian rapper and singer-songwriter

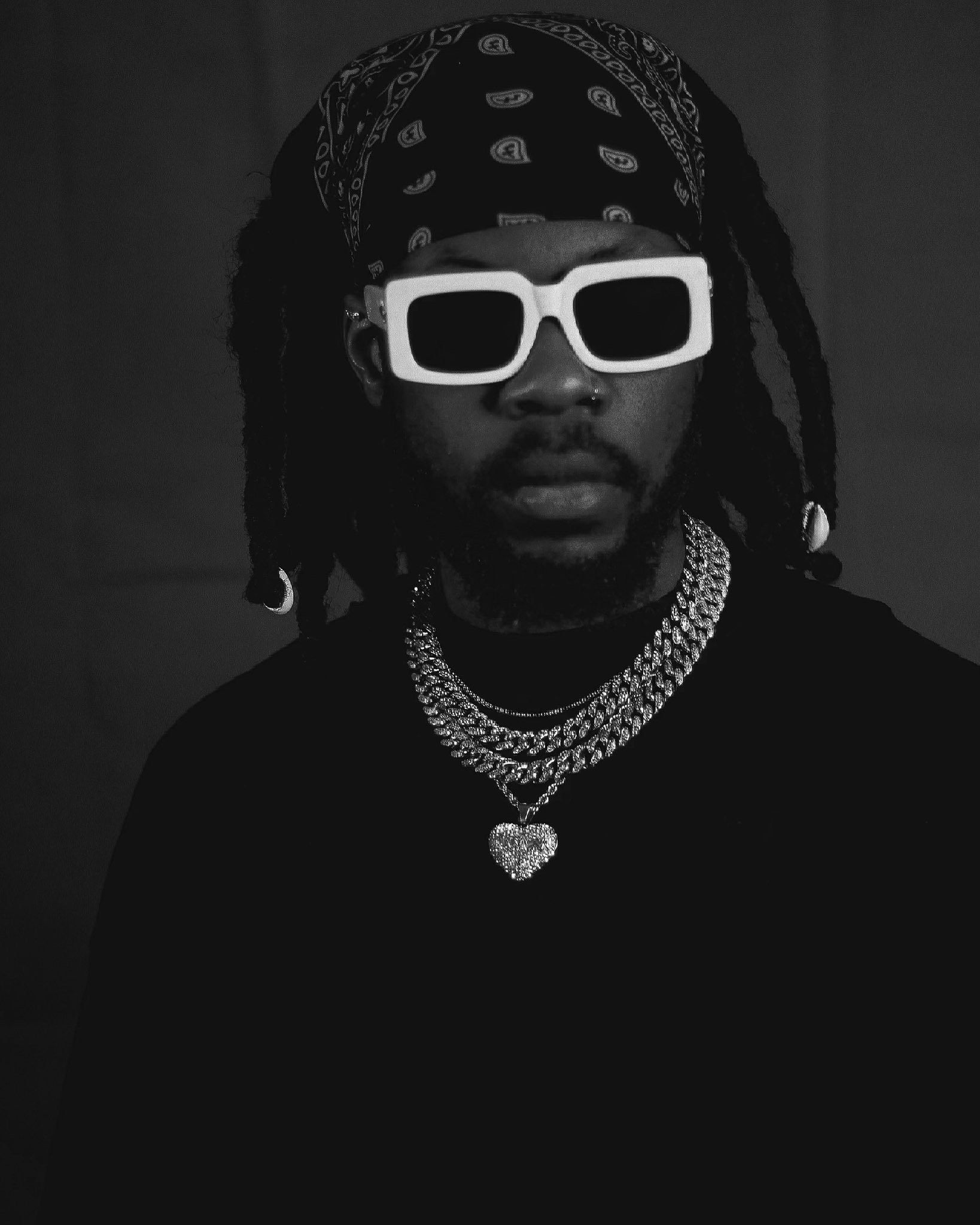
- Born: Daniel Tarlumun Ayu; 2 January 1995 (age 31); Jos, Plateau, Nigeria
- Occupations: Rapper; singer; songwriter
- Musical career
- Genres: Afrobeats; R&B; Hip-hop
- Instrument: Vocals
- Years active: 2016–present

Daniel Tarlumun Ayu, better known as Ayüü, is a Nigerian songwriter focusing on RnB, pop, funk, hip-hop and afrobeats.

== Biography ==
Ayüü began his music career in 2016, but before that he tells the 'We Are Black and Gifted', "my first musical experience was singing in the choir, singing to my aunt, singing my sister’s songs". he is one half of the duo SAFI, whose other member is Lady Donli,.

Ayüü debuted in 2017 with his EP 'HER (His Emotions Recorded)', a moving introduction to his R&B influenced foundation. he collaborated with neo soul artist Aylø on 'ØÜ', a collaborative EP released the same year. in summer 2018, Ayüü released the pop project 'Mango Juice and Bad Decisions'. later the following year in 2019, he shared his debut album, 'AYÜÜNIVERSE', inspired by Nigerian pop of the 2000s, dancehall, R&B,hip-hop, etc.,.

Following the release of the Nigerian film 'Glamour Girls' on 24 June 2022, tracks selected by Tatenda Terence Kamera 'Pull Up', '4AMIN' and 'Not Drake, Like Davido' were featured in the film's soundtrack. in September 2022, Ayüü released his second album, Toxic Sweet . Toxic Sweet has nine tracks and features GJtheCaesar, Dopeman Twizzy and Andrę Wolff, with instrumental arrangements by DOZ, Le Mav, KC and Don Ozi,,.

== Discography ==
=== Album ===
list of studio albums with selected details
Title	Album details	Ref.
Toxic Sweet	Released: 16 September 2022; Label: Daniel Tarlumun Ayu / Sound Genie; Formats : Digital download, streaming	
Ayüüniverse	Released: 19 December 2019; Label: Daniel Tarlumun Ayu; Formats: Digital download, streaming	

=== EP ===
List of extended plays, with selected details
Title	Details	Ref.
you're gonna lüv this (with Wavy the Creator)	Released: 14 March 2025; Label: TAP Entertainment; Formats : Digital download, streaming	
Fuzion: Ready when Ü are (with Marzi)	Released: 27 November 2020; Label: JAM Distro; Formats : Digital download, streaming	
Mango Juice and Bad Decisions – EP	Released : 2 October 2018; Label: Daniel Tarlumun Ayu; Formats : Digital download, streaming	
ØÜ (with Aylø)	Released: 15 December 2017; Re-Released: 11 April 2018; Label: ØÜ; Formats : Digital download, streaming	
H.E.R. (His Emotions Recorded) – EP	Released : 25 May 2017; Label: Self-released; Formats : Digital download	

=== Singles ===
Title	Year	Certifications
Losing Ü (feat. Tomi Thomas)	2017	
Sürf's Üp (feat. GJtheCaesar)	2018	
Discuss (feat. Prettyboy D-O)	2019	
Nasty (feat. Zilla Oaks)	2019	
Covid Riddim Freestyle	2020	
Swollen (feat. André Wolff & PsychoYP)	2020	
Hypnotized (feat. Marzi)	2020	
