= Behind the Scenes (2025 film) =

2025 Nigerian film

- Promotional poster
- Directed by: Funke Akindele; Tunde Olaoye
- Written by: Funke Akindele; Collins Okoh; Uche Mordi
- Story by: Funke Akindele
- Produced by: Funke Akindele; Wendy Uwadiae Imasuen
- Starring: Funke Akindele; Scarlet Gomez; Uzor Arukwe; Destiny Etiko; Mr Macaroni; Ini Dima-Okojie
- Music by: Tolu Obanro
- Production company: Funke Ayotunde Akindele Network (FAAN)
- Distributed by: FilmOne Distributions
- Release date: 12 December 2025
- Running time: 144 minutes
- Country: Nigeria
- Languages: English, Yoruba, Nigeria Pidgin

Behind the Scenes is a 2025 Nigerian drama film produced by Funke Akindele and Wendy Uwadiae Imasuen, and directed by Akindele. It stars Akindele, Tobi Bakre, Vee, Iyabo Ojo, Scarlet Gomez, Uzor Arukwe, Uche Montana, Ini Dima-Okojie, Ibrahim Chatta, Destiny Etiko, Mr Macaroni, among others.

Akindele announced the film during her 48th birthday celebration, describing it as "intriguing, captivating, and deeply personal". Behind the Scenes premiered in cinemas nationwide on 12 December 2025. It received generally positive reviews and grossed over ₦500 million within its first week of release, becoming the fastest Nollywood film to achieve the feat.

== Plot summary ==
Behind the Scenes tells the story of Aderonke "Ronky-Fella" Faniran, a successful real estate entrepreneur whose generosity toward family and friends began to take a toll on her. She began to feel and suspect that her family and friends do not exactly have her back as she does. This personal toll forced her to make a big decision that made her see people in a whole different light, raising questions about family, love, boundaries, and betrayal.

== Cast ==
- Scarlet Gomez as Aderonke "Aronky-Fella" Faniran
- Funke Akindele as Adetutu Fernandez
- Tobi Bakre as Adewale Fernandez
- Uzor Arukwe as Victor Ossai
- Ini Dima-Okojie as Segilola Benson Fernandez
- Iyabo Ojo as Alero
- Mr Macaroni as Johnson
- Uche Montana as Mariam
- Destiny Etiko as Oluchi
- Ibrahim Chatta as Afeez
- Batife Bentley as Herself
- Victoria Adeyele as Wendy

== Production and release ==
Co-producer Wendy Imasuen described Behind the Scenes as "heart-wrenching" stating that everybody had to be on top of their game to make the film a success. FilmOne Entertainment secured global distribution rights to the film, becoming its official distributor. The film grossed ₦512 million at the box office emerging as the fastest Nollywood film to reach the mark. Akindele revealed she spent over ₦1 billion on the project and urged fans to avoid piracy.

Following its theatrical run, Behind the Scenes became available on Netflix on 3 April 2025. The film achieved commercial success in cinemas, grossing ₦2.7 billion worldwide and becoming the highest-grossing Nollywood film at the time of its release.

== Awards and nominations ==
Year	Award	Category	Recipient	Result	Ref
2026	Africa Magic Viewers' Choice Awards	Best Lead Actress	Scarlet Gomez	Nominated	
2026	Africa Magic Viewers' Choice Awards	Best Supporting Actress	Funke Akindele	Nominated	
2026	Africa Magic Viewers' Choice Awards	Best Supporting Actor	Uzor Arukwe	Nominated	
2026	Africa Magic Viewers' Choice Awards	Best Makeup	Feyisayo Oyebisi & Hakeem Onilogbo	Nominated	
2026	Africa Magic Viewers' Choice Awards	Best Movie	Funke Akindele	Nominated	
2026	The Headies	Best Original Song for Visual Media	Funke Akindele & Tolu Obanro	Pending	
