= Jacob Khawe =

South African politician

Provincial Secretary of the African National Congress in Gauteng
- In office July 2018 – June 2022
- Deputy: Nomantu Nkomo-Ralehoko
- Chairperson: David Makhura
- Preceded by: Hope Papo
- Succeeded by: TK Nciza

Executive Mayor of Emfuleni Local Municipality
- In office December 2017 – December 2018
- Preceded by: Simon Mofokeng
- Succeeded by: Gift Moerane

Personal details
- Citizenship: South Africa
- Party: African National Congress
- Spouse(s): Khusela Diko (divorced) Thuliswa Nkabinde-Khawe (died 2019) Nthabeleng Khawe (m. 2020)

Jacob Khawe is a South African politician who was the Provincial Secretary of the African National Congress (ANC) in Gauteng from 2018 to 2022. He was formerly the Mayor of Emfuleni Local Municipality from 2017 to 2018 and before that he represented the ANC in the Gauteng Provincial Legislature.

== Political career ==
Khawe is a member of the African National Congress (ANC); his local party branch is in Vanderbijlpark in Gauteng. By 2010, he was the Provincial Chairperson of the ANC Youth League's Gauteng branch. In that year, the provincial league nominated him to stand for election as Deputy Provincial Secretary of the mainstream ANC in Gauteng, but the position went to Humphrey Mmemezi instead. By 2013, Khawe was a Member of the Gauteng Provincial Legislature and chaired its committee on public safety. He was re-elected to his legislative seat in the 2014 general election, in which he was ranked 20th on the ANC's party list in Gauteng.

However, he did not complete his term in the legislature: in December 2017, he was sworn in as the Executive Mayor of Emfuleni Local Municipality, succeeding the controversial Simon Mofokeng. The ANC Youth League later congratulated Khawe on turning the municipality around, while the Daily Maverick's Qaanitah Hunter labelled his turnaround campaign a "notorious" failure. In early June 2018, it was reported that Khawe had resigned as Mayor in response to the provincial ANC's decision to allow the provincial government to intervene in the governance of the municipality. Days later, however, the ANC announced that it had not accepted Khawe's resignation and that Khawe continued in the mayoral office.

=== ANC Provincial Secretary: 2018–2022 ===
Khawe's supporters alleged that the decision to authorise provincial intervention in Emfuleni was part of a political campaign against Khawe amid his campaign to succeed Hope Papo as Provincial Secretary of the ANC's Gauteng branch. Khawe's candidacy was endorsed by the provincial ANC Youth League and by the ANC's large regional branch in Ekurhuleni. He was viewed as strongly aligned to a slate of candidates headed by Lebogang Maile; News24 said that both Khawe and Maile were rumoured to have the support of Paul Mashatile, who was formerly the ANC's longstanding Provincial Chairperson in Gauteng.

When the party's provincial elective conference was held in July 2018, Khawe won in a vote to be elected ANC Provincial Secretary; he was deputised by Nomantu Nkomo-Ralehoko, who had also run on Maile's slate, although Maile himself failed to gain election as Deputy Provincial Chairperson. Several months after his election to the full-time party office, Khawe resigned as Emfuleni mayor.

In April 2022, near the end of Khawe's term as ANC Provincial Secretary, his wife Nthabeleng alleged on social media that he had physically abused her regularly since they married in December 2020. At a special meeting, the leadership of the Gauteng ANC resolved to refer the allegations for further investigation by the party's national Integrity Commission. Although he agreed to cooperate with the internal ANC inquiry, Khawe denied the allegations, and, since no criminal charge had been laid against him, he was not required by party policy to "step aside". However, he requested, and was granted, special leave from his party office. Nkomo-Ralehoko, as his deputy, assumed his duties in an acting capacity. On 1 June 2022, David Makhura, then the ANC's Provincial Chairperson in Gauteng, announced that the ANC's national Integrity Commission had made no finding about Khawe's conduct and had referred the matter back to the provincial party, which had cleared Khawe to return to work.

=== Re-election bid: 2022 ===
As the expiry of his term approached, Khawe announced that he would seek re-election as ANC Provincial Secretary. Also in the race was Thulani Kunene, who ran on a slate aligned to presidential contestant Panyaza Lesufi, and Thembinkosi Nciza, who ran on a slate aligned to Lebogang Maile. Khawe said that he hoped to emerge as a compromise candidate acceptable to both factions. However, when the party elective conference was held in June 2022, Khawe was resoundingly defeated, earning only 56 votes against Kunene's 525 votes and Nciza's 534. He also failed to gain election as an ordinary member of the ANC's Provincial Executive Committee.

== Personal life ==
Khawe was formerly married to fellow Gauteng politicians Khusela Diko (née Sangoni) and, until her death in November 2019, Thuliswa Nkabinde-Khawe. In December 2020, he married his third wife, Nthabeleng Khabutlana, a businesswoman from the Free State.
