= Campfire songs (disambiguation) =

Campfire songs are a genre of songs associated with camping and campfires.

Campfire song or campfire songs may also refer to:

- Campfire Songs (Animal Collective album), 2003, by Campfire Songs, later known as Animal Collective
- Campfire Songs (10,000 Maniacs album), a 2004 compilation by 10,000 Maniacs
- "A Campfire Song", a song by 10,000 Maniacs from their 1987 album In My Tribe
- "The Campfire Song", a song in The Lightning Thief (musical)
- "Campfire Song Song", a song featured on the 2009 album SpongeBob's Greatest Hits

== See also ==
- Campfire (disambiguation)#Arts and entertainment
- Bonfire (disambiguation)
