= Khusela Diko =

South African politician, public servant, and communications strategist

Khusela Diko (née Sangoni) is a South African politician, public servant, and communications strategist. She was spokesperson to South African President Cyril Ramaphosa from March 2018 until July 2020, when she was implicated in a high-profile COVID-19 procurement scandal and took extended special leave. She was formerly the head of communications for the African National Congress (ANC) from 2016 to 2018 and before that was head of communications for the Gauteng provincial government. She has also served on the Provincial Executive Committee of the ANC in Gauteng, and in December 2022 she was elected to a five-year term on the party's National Executive Committee.

== Early life and career ==
Diko is the only daughter of Nkosikazi Nolwandle Sangoni and is a princess of the Nobetha clan of the abaThembu of the Eastern Cape. She matriculated from Collegiate Girls High School in Port Elizabeth in 1993 and later earned a Bachelor of Commerce degree.

Diko was formerly the spokesperson for the African National Congress (ANC) Youth League and chief director of communications in the provincial government of Gauteng. In June 2016, she was appointed national communications manager for the national ANC, a full-time job at the head of the ANC's department of information and publicity, based out of the party's headquarters at Luthuli House in Johannesburg. For most of her time in that role, she worked alongside ANC spokesman Zizi Kodwa. She was also a member of the ANC and by 2018 she served on the Provincial Executive Committee of the party's Gauteng branch. She resigned from the ANC position on 1 March 2018.

== The Presidency ==
The day after Diko resigned from Luthuli House, the Presidency announced that she had been appointed spokesperson to President Cyril Ramaphosa in the Union Buildings, with effect from 12 March 2018.

=== Covid-19 procurement scandal ===
In July 2020, during the COVID-19 pandemic, Diko took a leave of absence from the Presidency pending the outcome of an investigation into her husband's involvement in a state contract. The Sunday Independent alleged that her husband was a director of a company, Royal Bhaca Projects, that had been awarded state contracts to provide the Gauteng Department of Health with personal protective equipment, at an inflated price of R125 million. Diko's husband said that Royal Bhaca had cancelled the contract and had never received any payment from the department. The scandal was inflamed by allegations that the Dikos were close to Bandile Masuku and his wife Loyiso; Masuku was the Member of the Executive Council for Health in Gauteng and therefore the political head of the relevant department. Diko maintained her innocence.

Diko was replaced by Tyrone Seale in an acting capacity while the Special Investigating Unit (SIU) investigated the allegations. The SIU ultimately found that R43-million worth of contracts had been awarded to Royal Bhaca irregularly and at inflated prices.

=== Disciplinary processes ===
While the SIU investigation was still ongoing, the ANC subjected Diko to an internal disciplinary process through its provincial disciplinary committee, which in April 2021 found her guilty of bringing the party into disrepute. The disciplinary committee instructed her to "step aside" from her position as a member of the Gauteng ANC's Provincial Executive Committee, pending the conclusion of the SIU investigation. While the committee had no authority over her employment at the Presidency, it also recommended that she "voluntarily and with a discussion with the employer, in the interest of the ANC, extend [her] leave in the presidency until the SIU concludes its investigation".

Simultaneously, Diko was subject to a government disciplinary process in her capacity as an employee of the Presidency, arising from the SIU's concern that she had failed to disclose certain financial interests as required by public service regulations. According to the Presidency, as of January 2021:

The SIU has reported that while the corruption component of the investigation is ongoing, the SIU has thus far not obtained any evidence pointing to Ms Diko’s involvement in the awarding of two contracts by the Gauteng Department of Health to Royal Bhaca or in respect of the irregularities identified in respect of such awards. During its investigation, the SIU did, however, identify a concern regarding Ms Diko’s duty to disclose all her financial interests.

The government disciplinary process concluded in August 2021 and Diko was served with a written warning for her non-disclosure offence. The Presidency said that she was on maternity leave and would "not return to the position of Spokesperson to the President" but that she would return "to a different position in the public service".

=== Aftermath ===
Diko did not return to work at the Presidency; Tyrone Seale continued to act as presidential spokesperson until a permanent replacement, Vincent Magwenya, was appointed with effect from 1 June 2022. The Daily Maverick reported that when she returned from maternity leave in October 2021, she was likely to be appointed as a deputy director-general at the Government Communication and Information System.

At an ANC provincial elective conference in July 2022, Diko was re-elected to her seat on the Provincial Executive Committee of the Gauteng ANC. In December that year, at the ANC's 55th National Conference, she was elected for the first time to a five-year term on the party's National Executive Committee. Her candidacy was supported by the leadership of the ANC Youth League and she received 1,439 votes across the 4,029 ballots cast, making her the 28th most popular of the 80 candidates elected to the committee.

== Personal life ==
Diko was formerly married to Gauteng politician Jacob Khawe. She was later married to Chief Thandisizwe Diko, styled as King Madzikane II of the amaBhaca of kwaBhaca in the Eastern Cape. They met in 2015, were legally married in 2016, and held a traditional royal wedding over two days in mid-December 2018. Thandisizwe Diko died in East London in February 2021 after a short illness. Their only child was born in August that year.
