= This One Is Personal =

Studio album by Tiwa Savage
- Released: 29 August 2025
- Genres: R&B; Afrobeats
- Length: 42:20
- Languages: English; Yoruba
- Label: Empire
- Producers: Aod; Gabriel Augustin; Josiah Bassey; Emeka E.O.; James Fauntleroy; Felix Joseph; Gaeten Judd; Kmkz; Kofo; Magicsticks; Ayodeji Mallo; Mystro Sugar; Ayodeji Olowu; Olasupo Olushola; Rymez; Jack Siegz; TSB; Henry Was; Kenneth Wright; Zone

Tiwa Savage chronology
Water & Garri (2021)	This One Is Personal (2025)

Singles from This One Is Personal
- 1. "You4Me" Released: 22 April 2025; 2. "On the Low" Released: 29 July 2025

This One Is Personal is the fourth studio album by Nigerian singer Tiwa Savage. It was released on 29 August 2025, via the independent record label Empire Distribution. The album comprises 15 tracks and was supported by the singles "You4Me" and "On the Low". Artists who were featured on This One Is Personal include Skepta and James Fauntleroy.

== Background and promotion ==
In December 2024, Savage suggested that This One Is Personal might be her final album, and said she was worn out. This One Is Personal comprises 15 tracks and features guest collaborations with Skepta, James Fauntleroy, and Taves. Recorded across Nashville, London, and Lagos, the album examines topics of faith, love, heartbreak, and renewal. Savage told Apple Music that This One Is Personal is her "most vulnerable" album to date, and said it took her two years to complete the project. She added that although the album was recorded during a trying time in her life, the process of creating it was quite healing.

Savage promoted the album by hosting a free concert at London's Koko venue. She partook in a Q&A session with her fans and previewed the album's songs on Sunday Brunch.

The album's lead single, "You4Me", was released on 22 April 2025. It was produced by Mystro and contains a sample of Tamia's 1998 single "So Into You". The track is composed of two verses and combines Afrobeats with 90s R&B music. The accompanying music video for "You4Me" was directed by Liam S. Gleeson and filmed in London.

== Critical reception ==
The Native's Temiloluwa Adeyemo rated the album 7.1 out of 10, describing it as an "intimate journey of emotional growth, healing, and self-discovery". Adeyemo also said the album provides "clarity" and is "universally relatable". Writing for The Lagos Review, Michael Kolawole described This One is Personal as being "intimate, cohesive, and defiantly against the grain". Kolawole further stated that the record is "emotionally honest" and "feels like the culmination of years of grind and growth". In a review for Afrocritik, Abioye Samson awarded the album 7.6 out of 10, saying Savage's "truest strength lies in R&B, where her storytelling, vocal range, and melodic instincts find their richest and most evocative expression". Omotoyosi Idowu gave the album a rating of 7 out of 10, characterizing it as "a deeply intimate" record that is "raw, vulnerable, and layered with emotional honesty". Writing for Clash, Shanté Collier-McDermott also rated the album 7 out of 10, saying it is "honest" and "teeters between the ups and downs of love, sex and relationships".

=== Accolades ===
Year	Awards ceremony	Award description(s)	Results	Ref
2026	The Headies	Album of the Year	Pending	
2026	The Headies	Best R&B Album	Pending	

== Track listing ==
This One Is Personal track listing
No.	Title	Writer(s)	Producer(s)	Length
1.	"I'm Done"	Tiwatope Savage; Jaleishanna Lattimore	Kmkz; Mystro Sugar^{[c]}	3:06
2.	"Angel Dust"	Savage; Donel Mangena	Kofo; TSB; Mystro Sugar^{[c]}	2:55
3.	"You4Me"	Savage; Segun Ajayi; Tim Kelley; Ronald LaPread; Mangena; Lionel Richie; Bob H. Robinson; Taiwo Sotonwa; Tamia Washington	Mystro Sugar; Anyanwu Uzoamaka^{[c]}; Magicsticks^{[c]}	2:37
4.	"On the Low" (with Skepta)	Savage; Joseph Adenuga; Ajayi; Mangena; Sak Pase	Rymez; Mystro Sugar^{[c]}	2:30
5.	"Holding It Down"	Savage; Ajayi; Mangana	Mystro Sugar; Aod; Felix Joseph	3:14
6.	"10%"	Savage; The Kazez	Ayodeji Olowu; Emeka E.O.; Mystro Sugar^{[c]}; Shabba^{[c]}	2:49
7.	"Twisted"	Savage; Maleik Loveridge; Mangena	Gabriel Augustin; Zone; Obi Aura^{[c]}; Rasool^{[c]}	2:59
8.	"Scared of Love"	Savage; Demi Hairston	Gaeten Judd; Mystro Sugar^{[c]}	2:48
9.	"Pray No More"	Savage; Josiah Bassey; Jesimiel Damina; Maxx Moor; Kenneth Wright	Bassey; Wright; Mystro Sugar^{[c]}	2:46
10.	"Addicted" (with Taves)	Savage; Toluwanimi Aluko; The Kazez	Emeka E.O.; Ayodeji Mallo; Mystro Sugar^{[c]}	1:59
11.	"This One Is Personal (Interlude)"	Savage; Ajayi; Tai Sotonwa	Mystro Sugar	2:31
12.	"Will I Run Again?"	Savage; Lulu	Magicsticks; Olasupo Olushola; Mystro Sugar^{[c]}	3:00
13.	"For One Night"	Savage; Mangena	TSB; Mystro Sugar^{[c]}	2:29
14.	"You're Not the First (You're Just the Worst)"	Savage; Hairston	Henry Was; Jack Siegz; Mystro Sugar^{[c]}	3:31
15.	"Change" (with James Fauntleroy)	Savage; Ajayi; James Fauntleroy	Mystro Sugar; Fauntleroy	3:06
Total length:				42:20

== Personnel ==
Credits are adapted from Tidal.

- Tiwa Savage – vocals
- Michael Según Ajayi – engineering (tracks 1–6, 12)
- Jroc – engineering (7, 14)
- Mystro Sugar – engineering (8–11, 15), background vocals (12)
- TSB – engineering (13)
- Sam Harper – mixing
- Skyler Gibbons – mixing
- Graeme Lynch – mastering
- Dionna Johnson – product management
- Demi Hairston – background vocals (8)

== Charts ==
Chart performance for This One Is Personal
Chart (2025)	Peak position
UK Album Downloads (Official Charts)	42
UK R&B Albums (Official Charts)	18
