= Na Scra =

2025 single by Famous Pluto

Single by Famous Pluto

from the EP Uzama The 3rd
- Released: March 7, 2025
- Genre: Amapiano
- Length: 2:30
- Label: ONErpm; Plutomania
- Songwriter: Osahon Grandeur Uzama
- Producer: Busy Pluto

Famous Pluto singles chronology
"Feel D Mood" (2024)	"Na Scra" (2025)	"1 WORK" (2025)

Music video
- "Na Scra" on YouTube

"Na Scra" is the debut single by Nigerian singer and songwriter Famous Pluto, released on March 7, 2025, through Plutomania Records and ONErpm. It serves as the lead single from his debut extended play Uzama The 3rd. The song was produced by Busy Pluto, and debuted at number 8 on the Nigeria TurnTable Top 100.

== Background ==
In 2025, Pluto secured a landmark recording contract with Plutomania Records, a label founded by his brother Shallipopi. Subsequent to this pivotal signing, Pluto took to social media to unveil his forthcoming debut single. The song's release proved to be a watershed moment in his career, as it rapidly gained traction on TikTok and dominated various prominent music charts.

== Music video ==
The official music video for Na Scra was released on April 4, 2025.

=== Accolades ===
Year	Awards ceremony	Award description(s)	Results	Ref
2026	The Headies	Best Street-Hop Artiste (Famous Pluto for "Na Scra")	Pending	

== Charts ==
Chart performance for "Na Scra"
Chart (2025)	Peak position
Nigeria (TurnTable Top 100)	8
Top Street-POP Songs (TurnTable)	2
Official Streaming Songs (TurnTable)	3
