= Wavy the Creator =

Wavy The Creator
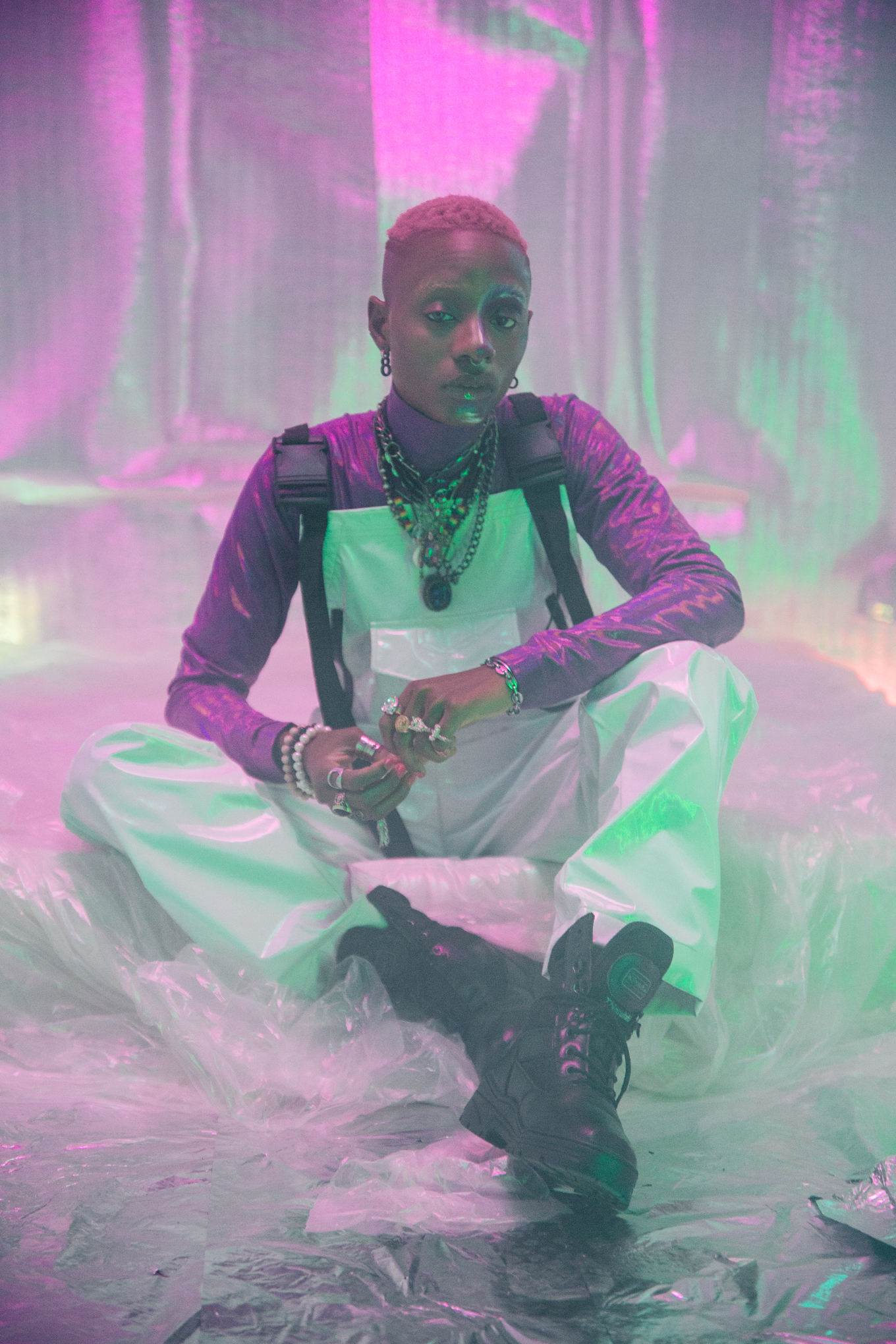
- On set at the 'Body Deep' Video Shoot

Background information
- Born: Jennifer Ejoke; Lagos
- Genres: Alternative R&B, Pop, Alté
- Occupation: Visual Artist
- Years active: 2017-Present
- Label: Disturbing London

Jennifer Ejoke, professionally known as Wavy the Creator (stylized as Wavy The Creator), is a recording artist, photographer, fashion designer and film-maker, born in Lagos, Southwest Nigeria and raised in the United States. She is best known for her song "H.I.G.H" and as the official photographer of Nigerian hip-hop artist Olamide.

== Career ==
Wavy's began her career in 2017 as a performance photographer at the One Africa Musicfest concert in Houston, Texas, where she met Nigerian rapper Olamide. She eventually became his personal photographer and videographer under the name Wavy Film. Wavy moved back to Lagos in 2017 to collaborate on visual projects with Olamide. Shortly thereafter, she began to photograph other Nigerian musicians and released her fashion collection Azif.

In June 2017, Wavy launched her music career with the release of her debut single "H.I.G.H" (Her in Greater Heights), which resulted in an invitation to open for Skepta and his Boy Better Know crew at the Homecoming Africa concert in Lagos, performing alongside the likes of J Hus, Wizkid and Davido.

In January 2018, she released her sophomore single "Stay", and later in the same year, she signed with Tinie Tempah's Disturbing London, releasing her debut single "Shaku" with the label. The single, which is a play on the popular Nigerian dance style known as Shaku-Shaku, was premiered and reviewed online by Vogue magazine.

In 2019, she released Interlude 3 featuring Zamir, a third installment of a series of interludes she released since her debut single. The interludes are softer, more intimate creative expressions, which are different from her usual productions. Interlude 3 was produced by Genio Bambino and the visuals were produced and directed by TSE and SAN V.

In May 2019, Wavy the Creator released "Body Deep", a record produced by Dutch producer Spanker, alongside visuals courtesy of Nigerian director Meji Alabi.

== Discography ==
=== Selected singles ===
As lead artist
Year	Title	Album
2017	"H.I.G.H. (Her In Greater Heights)"	Non-album single
2017	"Stay"	Non-album single
2018		Non-album single
2018	"Acoustic A3 Sessions"	Non-album single
2018	"Shaku"	Non-album single
2019	"Body Deep"	Non-album single
2020	"Black Card" (featuring PsychoYP)	Non-album single
As featured artist
Year	Title	Album
2017	"What You Like" (Omagz featuring Wavy The Creator)	Non-album single
2017	"Pegasus" (Oma Mahmud featuring Wavy The Creator & Brisb)	Pink
2018	"Let Me Tell You" (Robby featuring Wavy The Creator)	Time
2018	"Piac" (André Wolff featuring Ayüü & Wavy The Creator)	Non-album single
2019	"DND" (Bils featuring Kida Kudz & Wavy The Creator)	Non-album single
