= Communal Areas Management Programme for Indigenous Resources =

Zimbabwean natural resource management program

The Communal Areas Management Programme for Indigenous Resources (CAMPFIRE) is a Zimbabwean community-based natural resource management program. It is one of the first programs to consider wildlife as renewable natural resources, while addressing the allocation of its ownership to indigenous peoples in and around conservation protected areas.

== Background ==
CAMPFIRE was initiated in 1989 by the Zimbabwean government as a program to support community-led development and sustainable use of natural resources. The 1975 Parks and Wildlife Act set the legal basis for CAMPFIRE by allowing communities and private landowners to use wildlife on their land, marking a substantial shift from colonial policy that made it illegal for local populations to utilize wildlife in any way.

Population pressures in Zimbabwe have led to people living in communal lands, much of which is arid and unsuitable for agricultural farming. CAMPFIRE would allow individuals to earn income on these communal lands through sustainable use of the environment and wildlife. CAMPFIRE is managed through Rural District Councils (RDCs) who distribute contracts for safari hunting and tourism and allocate revenue to local wards. Poaching was to be suppressed by the people in these hunting areas. While some endangered animals were killed, the program aimed at supporting these populations in the long run by managing hunting, decreasing illegal poaching, and strengthening the economic prospects of the community through environmental protection and revenue generation.

The US federal government has supported CAMPFIRE, principally through the United States Agency for International Development, or USAID. CAMPFIRE received $7.6 million initially and $20.5 million in 1994 from USAID. USAID did not renew its funding once their commitment ended in 2000.

== Results ==
CAMPFIRE has been implemented widely across Zimbabwe, encompassing 36 of Zimbabwe's 57 districts. CAMPFIRE earns revenue through safari hunting, the sale of animal products, and tourism contracts. During 1989–2001, CAMPFIRE generated over US$20 million of transfers to the participating communities, with 89% of revenue being generated through safari hunting. Twelve of the 37 districts with authority to market wildlife produced 97% of all CAMPFIRE revenues, reflecting the variability in wildlife resources and local institutional arrangements.

=== Benefits to Households ===
While crop and livestock cultivation are more susceptible to drought or irrigation failures, wildlife serves as a more dependable source of income due to their comparative advantage in the environment. The scale of benefits varies greatly across districts, wards and households. Rural district councils typically allocate 40–60% of revenue to wards, either through direct benefits or through funding projects. It has been estimated by the World Wildlife Fund that households participating in CAMPFIRE increased their incomes by 15–25%.

Communities also receive indirect benefits through community projects, such as the construction of schools, clinics, grinding mills, or prospects for additional income through employment as a game monitor or a related job. Depending on wildlife population density, some wards have diversified their revenue streams. For instance, the Mahenye ward had no elephants or large wildlife immediately around its district and opened game-viewing lodges to generate revenue in place of hunting contracts. Wards with higher per household revenue have encouraged immigration in order to increase population density in a way that would warrant the development of roads, schools, and other infrastructure suited for high population densities.

=== Wildlife and Land Management ===
Environmental benefits have been witnessed since CAMPFIRE's inception; elephant numbers have increased, buffalo numbers are either stable or witnessing a slight decrease, and habitat loss has diminished, and in certain regions, even reversed. Between 1980 and 2000, wildlife management as a percent of total land in Zimbabwe increased by 21%. Because rural district councils have an incentive to maintain revenue streams, hunting laws are heavily enforced and instances of illegal poaching have decreased.

As a result of CAMPFIRE, wildlife monitoring has increased but remains inconsistent and focused on large species, such as elephants. CAMPFIRE manages wildlife populations by maintaining a certain agreed upon hunting quota; the quotas take both species endangerment and sex ratios into account to maintain wildlife populations, since hunters tend to selectively hunt male animals for sport. CAMPFIRE has experimented with moving wildlife populations to different wards to benefit communities with lower populations and reduce wildlife competition within certain areas.

Because benefits were clearly linked to wildlife, CAMPFIRE helped to develop positive attitudes surrounding animal conservation; in districts, celebrations around the opening of grinding mills and other community projects would be accompanied by performances with animal costumes. Villagers are more likely to report neighbors for illegal poaching activity. Surveys have found that public awareness campaigns funded by CAMPFIRE revenues have been effective in reducing harmful community behavior, such as indiscriminate tree cutting and damaging fishing techniques.

== Criticisms ==
The sustainability of protecting wildlife is contingent upon market demand for safaris, hunting, and other wildlife commodities. After increased violence around land ownership, investment and tourism decreased, resulting in a decline of revenue generation across wards. Furthermore, CAMPFIRE's model is based on the sustainable consumptive use of endangered species as a strategy to increase the value of their remaining populations. This position clashed with the majority preservationist, anti-hunting public sentiment in the US as well as national and international law, in particular CITES. In 2014 the US stopped the importation of elephants and ivory into the US, halting much of the hunting and revenue carried out in CAMPFIRE communities. More recently, the Trump administration has lifted the US' ban on trophy imports.

Following Zimbabwe's economic downturn in the 2000s, CAMPFIRE experienced a greater degree of elite capture, with villagers reporting that council positions and CAMPFIRE-related employment opportunities being held by friends and family members of sitting councillors. RDCs have retained an increasing percentage of CAMPFIRE revenues and are criticized for being unresponsive to local concerns. In some areas, the communal projects are initiated but are not sustained, while the income from CAMPFIRE revenues is insufficient to substitute agricultural income.

Villagers express concern that wildlife protection supersedes their own safety and livelihood strategies. Some wards have restricted immigration, settlement expansion, and the use of natural resources. Physical restrictions on land expansion bar villagers from accessing more fertile land. Villagers have expressed that wildlife presents safety concerns for themselves, crops, and livestock.

== See also ==
- Integrated Conservation and Development Project
