= Grace Ladoja =

British-Nigerian music executive and director

Grace Ladoja MBE
- Born: London, U.K.
- Occupation: Music executive
- Partner: TeeZee

Grace Ladoja MBE is a British music executive. She founded Our Homecoming, a festival in Lagos, Nigeria which ran for three days each year from 2018 till date.

== Background ==
Ladoja was born in London to Adewolu Ladoja, the 44th Olubadan of Ibadan.

== Career ==
At Music Week magazine's annual UK awards night in 2017, Ladoja received the Rising Star award. At the 2021 awards night, Ladoja received the Entrepreneur award.

In 2018, she received an MBE (Member of the British Empire) for services to the music industry. From 2018 to 2021, Ladoja has been included in several lists of influential women.She worked as a manager and a long time collaborator of Skepta playing a role in his international career and in projects linking the UK and Nigerian creative industries.

== Personal life ==
Ladoja and Nigerian rapper TeeZee are partners, in 2021 they announced the birth of their first child.

== Honours ==
Ladoja made history as the first African woman to design a shoe for Nike.
