= Destiny Etiko =

Nigerian actress (born 1989)

- Born: 12 August 1989 (age 37); Udi, Enugu, Nigeria
- Education: Nnamdi Azikiwe University
- Occupation: Actress
- Years active: 2013–present
- Awards: Most Promising Actress, City People Entertainment Awards (2016)

Destiny Etiko // (born 12 August 1989) is a Nigerian actress. known for her work in the Nollywood film industry. She gained wider recognition following her performance in the film Idemili. In 2021, Etiko received the Nollywood Personality of the Year award at The Sun Awards in recognition of her contributions to the Nigerian film industry.

== Early life and education ==
Etiko was born in Udi, a village in Enugu State, located in the southeastern region of Nigeria. She was born into the family of late Mr Anonde Etiko and Mrs Eucharia Etiko. She received both her primary and secondary school education in Zik Primary School and Queens School respectively in Enugu State. She is a Nollywood actress very popular for her curves.

== Career ==
Etiko described in an interview with Vanguard, that she ventured into the Nigerian movie industry (Nollywood) in 2011. She described her experience then as a difficult one because she had to combine her acting career with her school requirements as she was still a student in the tertiary institution at the time. Etiko's career received prominence after she featured in a movie titled Idemili which was produced in 2012 by Ernest Obi but was not released until 2014. Her role in the movie earned her a City People Entertainment Awards nomination. Before her role in the movie titled Idemili, Etiko had appeared in other movies although did not receive prominent roles in them.

== Personal life ==
Unlike what has become the norm in the Nigerian movie industry which is relocating to Lagos state, a state located in the southwestern region of Nigeria in order to succeed as a creative, Etiko who was born in Enugu state, still resides there and has been living there throughout her acting career. Etiko in an interview affirmed that she had been a victim of sexual harassment against women by male movie producers who are by far the majority as pertains movie productions in Nigeria. In 2019, Etiko gifted her mum an apartment and praised her for supporting her decision to become an actress. Her father, on the other hand, had vehemently opposed her decision to become an actress at the initial time. In May 2020, she lost her father.

Etiko created a non-profit organization called the Destiny Etiko Foundation, intended to improve the conditions of people living in poverty. She has an adopted Daughter named Chinenye Eucharia.

== Controversies ==
Destiny was said to have had an affair with Captain Matthew Ekeinde the husband of ace movie star - Omotola Ekeinde Matthew was said to have bought her a car a luxury car. She was also involved in a scandal after sharing photos of a new SUV she got from billionaire Business man Tein Jack Rich, although both of them denied it.

== Awards and nominations ==
List of Destiny Etiko awards and nominations
Year	Award	Category	Result	Ref.
2016	City People Entertainment Awards	Most Promising Actress of the Year Award (English)	Won	

== Selected filmography ==
- Airline Babes (2012) as Martha
- Angelina (2013) as Helen
- Native Fowl (2014) as Chibuzor
- Idemili (2014) as Ekemma
- Madam 10/10 (2015) as Kellis
- Fear of a Woman (2016) noted
- 3 Days to Wed (2016)
- The Storm (2016)
- Evil Seekers (2017)
- Tears of Regret (2018)
- The prince & I (2019)
- Heart of Love (2019)
- My sisters love (2019)
- Poor Billionaire (2019) as Ujunwa
- Virgin goddess (2019)
- Queen of love (2019)
- The Sacred Cowry (2019)
- The Return of Ezendiala (2019)
- Barren Kingdom (2019)
- Honorable Ladies (2019)
- Pains of the Orphan (2019)
- Clap of Royalty (2019)
- The Hidden Sin (2019)
- Family Yoke (2019)
- King's Word (2019)
- Sound of Evil (2019)
- My Private Part (2019) as Stella
- Power of Royalty (2019)
- Sunset of Love (2019)
- London Prince (2019)
- Living in Poverty (2020)
- Hour of Victory (2020)
- Wrong turn (2021)
- The Ghost and the Tout Too (2021) as Ebere
- The Cab Ladies (2021) as Regina
- 3 Can Play (2022) as Ada
- Wanted by All (2022) as Ifenkili
- Widows money (2022)
- Daughters of Eagle (2022)
- Love Chase (2023) as Beatrice
- Loved and Lost (2023) as Camila
- City Girl (2023) as Babyna
- Woman of Power (2023)
- Jezebel (2023) as Charlotte
- Chasing Clout (2023) as Collette
- Beyond Beauty (2023 TV Movie) as Miriam
- Beyond Conception (2024) as Ncholo
- Saving Rita (2024) as Lora
- Rich mum, Poor Mum (2024) as Agnes
- Everybody Loves Jenifa (2024)

== See also ==
- List of Nigerian actors
