= Bon Fire =

2025 Nigeria short film

- Directed by: Anuoluwapo Sangokunle; Batife Bentley
- Written by: Chidera Nwobodo
- Starring: Batife Bentley; Eleshinla Basirat
- Release date: January 2025
- Running time: 4 minutes
- Country: Nigeria
- Language: English

Bon Fire is a 2025 short drama film directed by Anuoluwapo Sangokunle. The film stars Batife Bentley, who plays "Fatima", with the supporting cast that include Eleshinla Basirat.

== Synopsis ==
After a bonfire triggers memories of a traumatic experience from a high school camp, Fatima reflects on the assault she suffered at the hands of a trusted figure and the lasting impact it has had on her life. As she recounts the events and their aftermath, she confronts issues of trauma, trust, and survival.

== Cast ==
- Batife Bentley as Fatima
- Eleshinla Basirat

== Release and reception ==
Olufemi Adetola of New Telegraph gave Bon Fire a positive review, highlighting positively the screenplay by Chidera Nwobodo in portraying the theme of trauma in moderation and the acting skills of Ameera Eniola as Fatima. According to the reviewer, the film does well in handling the issues of justice and survival, but its major drawback is the film's short duration in which some aspects such as the characters' stories could be further developed. Henri Enoh Tchato of Critical Registrar gave Bon Fire a rating of 2.5 out of 5, He praised Ameera Eniola's performance and the film's use of fire to connect Fatima's present with her traumatic past. Tchato also praised the decision not to show the assault on screen, allowing Fatima to tell the story in her words. However, he criticized the dialogue for being too explanatory and noted that the four-minute runtime was too short to develop Fatimas relationship, with her friend and other parts of her story. Lucky of Report Naija praised Bon Fire for effectively conveying its themes within a four-minute runtime, highlighting its atmospheric opening and restrained approach to depicting trauma.
