= Zhus Jdo =

Nigerian musician

- Born: John Davidson Omon; 3 May 2000 (age 26); Benin City, Edo State, Nigeria
- Education: Ambrose Alli University
- Occupations: rapper; songwriter
- Years active: 2018–present
- Musical career
- Genres: Hip hop; Afrobeats; Afro Soul
- Instruments: Vocals; keyboards
- Label: Steady Grinding Inc.

John Davidson Omon (born 3 May 2000) known under the alias of Zhus Jdo, is a Nigerian rapper and singer-songwriter professionally . He rose to fame after his debut, "Johnbull", went viral on social media.

== Early life and education ==
Hail in Benin City, Edo State, Zhus Jdo is a Nigerian hip hop singer and songwriter. Born on 3 May 2000, his full name is John Davidson Omon. He completed his basic education at Golden Touch Group Schools and Word of Faith Group of Schools. He went on to study industrial chemistry and graduated from the Ambrose Alli University.

== Career ==
Zhus Jdo began his musical career professionally in 2018. In 2024, Omon signed a recording contract with the Cake Bizness and released his debut single, "Johnbull". The single became popular after making rounds on Twitter (now X), before it was nominated for the Best Street-hop Artiste at the 2025 edition of the Headies. On 4 October 2024, he released his debut extended play (EP), Dump on Em via Steady Grinding Inc. The EP was led by his debut single and it featured guest appearances from Nigerian musicians, Jeriq and Bhadboi OML on the song, "Divine Pree".

On 10 June 2025, Zhus Jdo dropped "1 Work" remix, a track from his EP Dump on Dem featuring Famous Pluto and Smur Lee. It peaked at 56 on TurnTable charts

== Accolades ==
Award	Year (Note: Indicates the year of ceremony. Each year is linked to the article about the awards held that year, wherever possible.)	Category	Recipient(s) or nominee(s)	Result	Ref.
Top Naija Music Awards	2021	Best Hip Hop Act with Potential	Himself	Won	
The Headies	2025	Best Street-hop Artiste	"Johnbull"	Nominated	
