= Lawrence Oyor =

Nigerian gospel music minister (born 1991)

Lawrence Gomba Oyor (born 16 June 1991) is a Nigerian gospel music minister, evangelist and songwriter.

== Early life and education ==
Lawrence Oyor was born in Ibadan, Oyo State, Nigeria, into a Christian family. His parents, Rev. Gomba Fortune Oyor and Rev. Patience Oyor.

He is a twin, with his brother Godswill Oyor also actively involved in ministry.

he attended Shalom Christian College in Ibadan and later studied law at the University of Ibadan, graduating in 2013. He proceeded to the Nigerian Law School and also received theological training at the Texas Bible Institute in the United States.

== Career and ministry ==
Oyor began his ministry during his university years, leading worship and participating in Christian fellowship activities. His professional gospel ministry became more prominent after 2013 when he committed to full-time ministry.

He co-founded the Davidic Minstrels, a global worship movement, alongside his twin brother. The group focuses on prophetic worship, revival chants, and spiritual awakening.

Oyor is also the founder of Catalyst Network International and serves as a senior pastor at the Davidic Generation Church, where he ministers primarily to youth and young adults.

=== Songs ===
- Favour
- Jugular Jugular
- Alignment Chant
- Burn the World
- My Daddy, My Daddy
- Eagles Flight
- Jesu my love
- Bowl of Fire
- Burn the World
- Fall in Love
- I Am Hungry

== Personal life ==
Lawrence Oyor is married to Darasimi Mike Bamiloye, a Nigerian scriptwriter and dramatist, and daughter of filmmaker Mike Bamiloye.

== Movies ==
- Prophet Suddenly 4 (2026)
- Prophet Suddenly 3 (2025)
- My Dream 2 (2023)
- 'Abattoir
