= Kunmie =

Nigerian singer and songwriter (born 2002)

- Born: Oluwabukunmi Ariyibi Peter; Lagos, Nigeria
- Education: Tolu Primary School; Mayday Secondary School
- Occupations: Singer; Songwriter
- Years active: 2019 –present
- Musical career
- Genres: Afrobeats; R&B; soul
- Instrument: Vocals
- Label: Alt Music

Oluwabukunmi Ariyibi Peter, known professionally as Kunmie, is a Nigerian singer, songwriter and producer. He rose to prominence in 2025 with her single "Arike" which peaked at number one on the TurnTable Top 100 chart and number five on the UK Afrobeats Singles Chart.

In 2026, he was nominated for Most Promising Artist of the Year and Best African Artist in African R&B and Soul at the All Africa Music Awards.

== Early life ==
Oluwabukunmi Ariyibi Peter was born in Lagos, Nigeria, and grew up in Abule Egba, Lagos, before later moving to Agege, Lagos. He is from Delta State and is of Itsekiri descent.

Peter became interested in music while in secondary school. He made his first song in Senior Secondary School year three, an experience that led him to see music as his main interest. At age 16, he left home to pursue music. In 2019, he met a man who encouraged him to continue with music and spoke to him about his future, telling him that music would be part of it. Peter said the encounter stayed with him and helped him during periods when he doubted his decision to pursue music.

Peter later enrolled in a university to study Business Administration but left after his first year. After leaving the university, he spent about a year studying poetry and listening to artists including Kamauu and Lord Huron. He commented that it helped him develop his musical style, which combines Afrobeats with soul, R&B, and elements of country music.

== Career ==
=== Songwriting and early work ===
Prior to releasing music under his own name, Kunmie worked as a songwriter for other artists. He stated that he wrote regularly for Oxlade and attended music camps, describing his participation in songwriting sessions as a means of learning the practices of the music industry. He stated that he attempted to sell the song "Arike" to Oxlade during this period, but that Oxlade advised him to retain it for himself.

=== Arike and breakthrough (2025) ===
"Arike" was released on 15 February 2025. Kunmie stated that the song circulated initially through TikTok, where a video posted at the time of recording accumulated views rapidly despite his having approximately 200 followers on the platform at the time of posting. The song debuted at number one on the Spotify Nigeria Viral 50 chart, reached number two on the Spotify Global Viral Chart, and generated over 186,000 user-generated videos on TikTok. It subsequently reached number one on the Official Nigeria Top 100 singles chart, where it spent at least three consecutive weeks. It also peaked at number five on the UK Official Afrobeats Chart and spent thirteen weeks on that chart. The song was included in the playlist of BBC Radio 1Xtra's Official UK Afrobeats Chart Show in March 2025.

In July 2025, a remix of "Arike" was released featuring Nigerian singer Simi and British singer Mabel. The Guardian Nigeria noted that the song had by that stage achieved over 6.25 million streams on Spotify, And accumulated over 80 million digital plays as of February 2026.

=== Before We Became Strangers EP ===
Kunmie released a four-track extended play titled Before We Became Strangers. The Guardian Nigeria described the project as narrative-driven, noting its use of consistent storytelling across its tracks.

=== Collaborations and subsequent releases ===
In addition to the Arike remix with Simi and Mabel, Kunmie collaborated with Bella Shmurda on a track titled "Sanity". He released "Solace II" with Joeboy in early 2026, described by The Lagos Review as a stripped-back meditation on unresolved emotional difficulty. In March 2026, he released the single "Julie". In July 2026, he released "Confessions", described by Independent as a Yoruba-language love song.

== Discography ==
=== Studio albums ===
Year	Title	Album details
2026	22	Released: 14 August 2026; Formats: Digital download, streaming

=== Extended plays ===
Year	Title	Notes
2025	Before We Became Strangers	

=== Selected singles ===
Year	Title	Notes
2025	"Arike"	No. 1 Official Nigeria Top 100; No. 5 UK Official Afrobeats Chart
2025	"Arike" (remix)	Featuring Simi and Mabel
2025	"Sanity"	Featuring Bella Shmurda
2026	"Solace II"	Featuring Joeboy
2026	"Julie"	
2026	"Confessions"	
2026	"Gorgeous"	Featuring Lojay

== Awards and nominations ==
Year	Award	Category	Nominated work	Result
2026	All Africa Music Awards (AFRIMA)	Most Promising Artist of the Year	Himself	Nominated
2026	All Africa Music Awards (AFRIMA)	Best African Artist in African R&B and Soul	Himself	Nominated
2026	Headies Awards	Song of the Year	"Arike"	Nominated
2026	Headies Awards	Best Recording of the Year	"Arike"	Nominated
2026	Headies Awards	Best R&B Album	Before We Became Strangers	Nominated
