= Our Homecoming =

Festival in Lagos, Nigeria

- Homecoming trademark
- Status: Active
- Genre: Afrobeats, Alternative music, Hip hop, Afro-swing, UK drill, Grime
- Date: Easter weekend
- Frequency: Annual
- Location: Lagos
- Country: Nigeria
- Years active: 2018–present
- Founder: Grace Ladoja
- Website: www.ourhomecoming.com

Our Homecoming (also referred to as Homecoming or Homecoming Festival), is an annual three-days music, fashion, sport, and arts festival in Lagos, Nigeria. It has been founded by Grace Ladoja, as a community under Metallic Inc. The platform was established for cultural exchange, sharing African creativity with the world as a way of connecting international creatives from Africa in the diaspora back to the motherland (Nigeria "Africa"). The festival provides a venue for workshops, football pitch, art museum, live bands, DJs, and musicians.

The festival is yearly supported by The NATIVE, Vivendii, Off-White, Browns, Patta, Ambush, Stüssy, and Nike. In 2019, UBA Group partnered with Homecoming to celebrate its Easter Festival in Lagos. The Homecoming matches kicks-off annually at Astro2000 Ikoyi, and the Cup was won by The Native team in 2018 and 2019, and International Girl Crew team won the 2020 cup.

== History ==
The Homecoming Festival is produced by Metallic Inc., and founded by Grace Ladoja. It was created to celebrate cultural heritage and creative excellence through the lens of music, fashion, art, and sport. The festival has been instrumental in giving back to the community, and has created opportunities for young people in various different creative industries to showcase their talent to the world.

On 1 October 2018, Julie Adenuga, launched a new docu series, Julie In Lagos, to document the event on Beats 1. The docu series features guest appearances from Wizkid, Skepta, Tiwa Savage, J Hus, Not3s, Odunsi (The Engine), Cruel Santino, and Wavy the Creator, with various brands, such as Vivendii, Off-White, Mains London, and Orange Culture. The third edition of the festival was hosted online in Nigeria and streamed in various countries within Africa and Europe, due to the pandemic without live audience. In August 2020, the panels unveiled its partners for the Homecoming Digital Festival with Browns, Mowalola, Casablanca, Off-White, Orange Culture, Patta, Vivendii, Post-Imperial, and Motherlan.

=== 2018: First edition ===
The first edition featured guess performance from Tiwa Savage, Nasty C, Skepta, Wizkid, Naomi Campbell, John Boyega, Jimmy Ayeni, Lady Donli, Teezee, Cruel Santino, Not3s, Mowalola, DJ Obi, Olamide, Taribo West, Daniel Amokachi, Davido, Ozwald Boateng, Greatness Dex, J Hus, Odunsi (The Engine), Lancey Foux, BBK and Imaan Hammam.

=== 2019: Second edition ===
The second edition featured guess performance from La Meme Gang, Fireboy DML, Moonchild Sanelly, Sho Madjozi, Naira Marley, Niniola, Rema, Tems, Simi, Prettyboy D-O, Cruel Santino, Odunsi (The Engine), Runtown, DRB LasGidi, Ajebutter22, Skepta, Poco Lee, Octavian, Teni, Davido, Wizkid, Tiwa Savage, J Hus, Nasty C, Not3s, BOJ, and Terri.

=== 2020: Third edition ===
The third edition featured guess performance from DJ Obi, Fireboy DML, Sho Madjozi, Naira Marley, Niniola, Rema, Tems, Simi, Prettyboy D-O, Cruel Santino, Odunsi (The Engine), Runtown, DRB LasGidi, Skepta, Poco Lee, Teni, Wizkid, Vivendii Boys, and Terri. On September 2, 2020, a furniture designer, Yinka Ilori exhibited his collection of I Got Chairs For Days, at the Browns East store in Shoreditch, London. The collection is a set of coloured chairs, as a reflection of his heritage, he tell's Lotte Brouwer of Livingetc.
