= Chella (singer) =

Nigerian singer

- Also known as: Chella Boi
- Born: Uzochukwu Michael Ikechukwu; 9 July 2004 (age 22); Abia State, Nigeria
- Genres: Afrobeats
- Occupations: Singer; songwriter
- Instrument: Keyboard
- Years active: 2023–present
- Label: Independent

Uzochukwu Michael Ikechukwu (born 9 July 2004), known professionally as Chella, is a Nigerian singer-songwriter. He gained recognition in 2024 with the release of his single, "Nyash Na Nyash". He followed up with "My Darling", which peaked at number 1 on the Shazam Global chart and became the fourth Nigerian song in history to top the chart. It also peaked at number 1 on the official Nigeria TurnTable Top 100 songs, and at number 8 on the Billboard U.S. Afrobeats Songs chart.

== Early life ==
Chella was born and raised in Abia State, Nigeria. He attended Immaculate Conception Primary and Secondary School, where he demonstrated a strong aptitude for both academics and music from an early age. Following his secondary education, Chella was admitted into Abia State University, furthering his academic pursuits while continuing to develop his passion for music.

== Career ==
On 18 April 2024, he released his breakthrough song titled "Nyash na Nyash", which enjoyed commercial success following its viral moments on TikTok, and released his debut extended play titled Tears Of A Mad Man on October 1, 2024. On 18 October 2024, Apple Music announced Chella as ‘Up Next Artiste' in Nigeria. In October 2024, he peaked at number 9 on TurnTable's NXT Emerging Top Artistes for the week of 18 October 2024 to 24 October 2024, spending a total of 8 weeks on the chart. On 1 November 2024, he released "Nyash na Nyash Remix" featuring fellow Nigerian artiste Young Jonn. On 14 March 2025, he ranked number 9 on TurnTable's Artiste Top 100.

On 26 March 2025, he released "My Darling", which became the fourth Nigerian song in history to reach number 1 on the Global Shazam chart. "My Darling" peaked at number 1 on the official Nigeria TurnTable Top 100 songs and the official streaming songs chart, and rose to the top 10 on the Billboard U.S. Afrobeats Songs chart at number 8. It also soundtracked over 2 million TikTok videos and is eligible for South Africa (RISA) Gold certification as of 17 May 2025.

== Discography ==
EPs

- Tears of a Mad Man

=== Singles ===
- "Nyash na Nyash"
- "Nyash na Nyash" (Remix) (featuring Young Jonn)
- "My Darling"
