= Ciza =

South African Musician and DJ

- Born: Nkululeko Ncizaa; 23 August 2001 (age 25); Benoni, South Africa, Gauteng, South Africa.
- Genres: Afrobeats; House; Afro-pop
- Occupations: Recording artist, DJ
- Years active: 2019–present

Nkululeko Nciza (born 23 August 2001), known professionally as Ciza, is a South African singer and songwriter. He was born in Benoni, Gauteng, South Africa, and is the eldest son of TK Nciza, a former record label executive, and Nhlanhla Mafu, lead vocalist of the Afro-pop group Mafikizolo. Raised in a musically inclined household, Ciza was exposed to the entertainment industry early. He began writing and composing music at 15.

== Career ==
Ciza began his professional music career in 2019. He released his debut single, "Come Alive," in July 2020, followed by "Adje," a song influenced by Yoruba culture that blends Afrobeats with South African Afro-pop. In 2021, he released the extended play "Golden Boy Pack," which featured collaborations with artists such as Major League DJz, DJ Maphorisa, Abidoza, and Tanzanian singer Marioo. His 2025 single "Isaka (6am)" received significant radio airplay in South Africa and topped the official SA chart. In addition to singing, Ciza has explored DJing.

== Personal life ==
Ciza is the eldest of four children born to TK Nciza and Nhlanhla Mafu. His siblings include Thamsanqa and Luvuyo. In 2009, the family experienced the loss of their daughter, Zinathi, in a car accident. Ciza generally maintains a private personal life. In 2024, he was linked to South African media personality Anele Zondo, with unconfirmed reports suggesting the couple was expecting a child.

== Discography ==
Ciza's EPs and Albums
Year	Title	Tracks	Contributors / Features	Ref
2019	Golden Boy Pack (EP)	Jiggy		
2019	Golden Boy Pack (EP)	Bank Notification	DJ Maphorisa, Madumane	
2019	Golden Boy Pack (EP)	Oya Dance	DJ Maphorisa, Madumane	
2019	Golden Boy Pack (EP)	Carolina	Abidoza, Major League DJz	
2019	Golden Boy Pack (EP)	Shotey	Marioo	
2021	Bad Guy Ciz (EP)	Passesa		
2021	Bad Guy Ciz (EP)	The Kidd		

Ciza's Singles
Year	Tracks	Contributors / Features	Ref
2019	Perfect Summer		
2019	One Life		
2020	Adje		
2020	Peaceful Night		
2020	Come Alive,		
2020	Breeze		
2020	One Life		
2020	Warm Summer Works		
2021	Carolina 2.0	Major League DJz & Abidoza	
2022	Ola Mama!	Tony Duardo, Seekay & Boibizza	
2022	Orlando		
2023	voodoo		
2024	Calls		
2024	Free Me	Maglera Doe Boy, Elizee	
2024	Inakayezi	FKA Moses, Sthibo de Beat	
2025	Isaka (6am)	Jazzworx, Thukuthela	
