= African Folder =

Media platform focusing on African culture

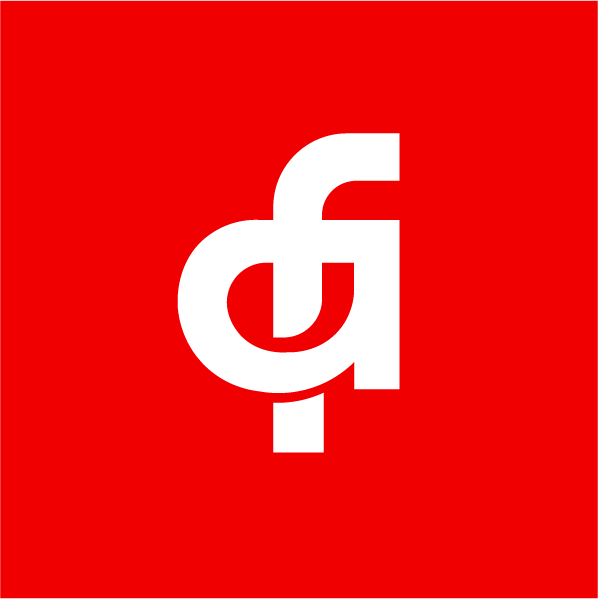
- Available in: English
- Headquarters: Lagos, Nigeria
- Country of origin: Nigeria
- Founder: Onyema Courage
- Website: africanfolder.com
- Launched: 2022; 4 years ago
- Current status: Active

African Folder is a digital media platform based in Lagos, Nigeria, dedicated to African culture, music, and entertainment. Founded in 2022 by Onyema Courage, the platform focuses on promoting contemporary African music, particularly Afrobeats, alongside cultural trends, interviews, and lifestyle content. It targets Africans on the continent and in the diaspora, achieving a reported reach of over 109 million in the first half of 2025. African Folder is noted for being the first African media company to employ AI writers to generate content in 2022.

== History ==
African Folder was established in 2022 by Onyema Courage to provide a digital platform for showcasing African music, culture, and entertainment, with a mission to tell African stories from an African perspective. The platform gained attention for its coverage of Afrobeats and for becoming the first African media company to integrate artificial intelligence into content creation in 2022. In an interview with Independent Nigeria, Courage stated, “Our vision from day one has been to redefine how African stories are told and consumed, not just on the continent, but globally. Reaching over 109 million people in six months shows that the world is listening. By integrating AI into our newsroom in mid-2022, we enhanced our capacity without diluting our creativity or cultural authenticity.” The platform is recognized for addressing the gap in positive, authentic African media representation.

== Content ==
African Folder publishes articles, music and movie reviews, and interviews, focusing on Afrobeats and other African music genres. The platform covers cultural events, fashion, and lifestyle, aiming to connect young Africans with contemporary trends. It has featured commentary from artists like Simi, who discussed her success in the music industry and the influence of female artists.

== Audience ==
African Folder targets a global audience, particularly young Afropolitans aged 18–35, with significant engagement from Nigeria, South Africa, and the United States. The platform's focus on authentic African narratives has resonated with both continental and diaspora audiences, contributing to its reported 109 million reach in the first half of 2025, including 86 million on Instagram, 13.6 million on Facebook, 8 million on Threads, and 2 million across Twitter, TikTok, email newsletters, and emoji-based campaigns.
