= Fola (singer) =

Nigerian singer (born 2001)

- Born: Afolarin Odunlami
- Occupations: Singer; songwriter
- Years active: 2014–present
- Musical career
- Genres: Afrobeats; Afrobeat; amapiano; afropop
- Labels: Dangbana Republik; Empire

Afolarin Odunlami, known professionally as Fola (stylised in all caps as FOLA), is a Nigerian singer-songwriter. He rose to fame in 2022 following the release of his song "Ginger Me", featuring Bella Shmurda was met with critical acclaim. He signed with Dangbana Republik and released his debut extended play, what a feeling (2024).

== Career ==
=== 2022–2025: Several music releases and What a Feeling ===
On March 24, 2022, Fola released his debut single "Ginger Me", which featured Bella Shmurda. On June 21, 2022, he released the single "Cool Me Down", featuring BBeatz. That same day, he released "Beholder," featuring Picazo. Fola had one solo record in 2022 titled "Bella", which is considered to be his first song without featuring other artists. He thereafter released his single "First Things First" in October 2022. On February 23, 2024, Fola released the single "Feeling." The song was described by NotJustOk magazine as ranging from "simple and soundly executed boasts to affairs" to "futuristic confessions" to "tales of love." He released the single "Alone" featuring BhadBoi OML on July 12, 2024. The single peaked at number 7 on the UK Afrobeats chart. It ranked number 7 on TheCable's top 10 radio picks. The music video was released the next day, and was directed by Akambi Pictures.

On October 4, 2024, he released the remix of "Alone" featuring Bnxn. The remix charted at number 1 on the Nigeria Official Streaming Songs, and number 4 on the TurnTable Top 100. Fola signed a major label recording contract with Dangbana Republik on October 11, 2024. He went on to release his debut extended play, What a Feeling, in December. The EP featured appearances from Bella Shmurda, Magixx, Bnxn, and BhadBoi OML. The extended play was described by TooXclusive as a testament to Fola's potential, with enchanting storytelling, good melodies, and thoughtful lyrics. An Album Talk review remarked that on the EP, Fola comes with "heartfelt writing and soulful melodies to tell relatable stories of love, desire, and heartbreak that appeal to the feelings." It's also a good debut effort, as it showcases Fola's strength and establishes a distinct sonic identity that sets him apart from his peers vying for their own breakthrough moments. African Folder praised "What a Feeling" as a fantastic project that consolidates a fantastic rookie year for Fola and introduces him to an audience who may not have been familiar with his talent.

On March 20, 2025, Zlatan announced on his social media pages that he would feature Fola on his upcoming song. The single, which happens to be "Get Better," was released the next day, March 21, 2025. The song debuted at number 2 on the TurnTable Top 100. It peaked at number 7 on the Billboard US Afrobeats Charts and also peaked at number 2 on the Nigeria Apple Music Chart. On April 11, 2025, Bella Shmurda and Fola released their collaborative single "Dangbana Riddim". The song was written by Bella Shmurda and Fola and was produced by Sbee. Fola released his first single of 2025, which featured Kizz Daniel, on April 24, 2025. The song debuted at number 8 on the Official UK Afrobeats Charts. On May 3, 2025, the music video for the song was released. On June 4, 2025, Fola was featured on Bnxn's "Very Soon". The song became the third single for Bnxn's sixth studio album, Captain. It debuted at number 5 on the Official UK Afrobeats Charts and number 9 on the Billboard US Afrobeats Charts. On July 25, 2025, Fola was featured on DJ Tunez "One Condition", alongside Wizkid. It peaked at number 4 on the Nigeria TurnTable Top 100. On August 7, 2025, Fola released "You". On August 15, 2025, Fola took to his social media handles to announce the forthcoming release of his debut studio album, Catharsis, which will be released on September 5, 2025.

=== 2026–present: "Paparazzi" and "B4 B4" ===
In January 2026, the single “Paparazzi” by Shoday and FOLA reached number 1 on the Official Nigeria Top 100 music chart, becoming their first No. 1 song in Nigeria and marking a major commercial achievement for both artists. On July 31, 2026, Fola was featured on Davido's sixth studio album, Oriadé, appearing alongside Mayorkun on the seventh track "B4 B4". The album features guest appearances from Black Sherif, Llona, Leon Thomas, and Aya Nakamura, and was released to coincide with the 15th anniversary of Davido's professional music career. It marked a departure from the 17-track format of his previous five studio albums.

== Discography ==
=== Studio albums ===
Title	Details	Ref
What a Feeling (EP)	Release date: December 1, 2024; Label: Dangbana Republik; Format: Streaming, Digital download	
Catharsis	Release date: September 4, 2025; Label: Dangbana Republik, Empire; Format: Streaming, Digital download	
