= Poco Lee =

Nigerian dancer and singer

- Born: Iweh Pascal Odinaka; October 21, 1996 (age 29); Orlu, Imo State, Nigeria
- Education: Lagos State University
- Occupation: Dancer . Singer . Influencer

Iweh Pascal Odinaka better known as Poco Lee is a Nigerian dancer and singer.

== Early life ==
Poco Lee was born on the 21st of October, 1996 in Orlu, Imo State, Nigeria to Kenneth and Augustina Iweh. He is the third of five children and was brought up in Ojo, Lagos. His father died when he was ten years old, leaving his mum to fend for the five children. He attended the Nigerian Navy Primary School in Lagos, completed his secondary education at the Command Day Secondary School and then proceeded to the Lagos State University for his bachelor's degree. Iweh got the sobriquet, "Poco Lee" in music class in junior secondary because of his small stature. The word "poco a poco" in Latin musical language means "little by little" in effecting musical transition, and friends humorously referred to him as "poco" for his small stature. Referring to how he got his name Lee said "they started calling me 'Poco'. I added “Lee" to spice it up". He is 5 ft 8 inches(172 cm) tall.

== Career ==
Poco Lee started dancing as a child. He later began street dancing in Lagos with his friends. Luckily, a street dance video of him went viral, and soon he got a call from Zlatan Ibile for a collaboration. Zlatan featured Poco Lee in his hit song, Zanku, and his dance moves and performance were credited for helping the video go viral. Soon enough, other A-List artistes came calling, and Lee has since then performed on stage and videos with Davido, Burna Boy, Wizkid, Reekado Banks, Tiwa Savage, Naira Marley and Niniola. He has also performed at the One Africa Music Festival in Dubai, the O2 Arena, London, and the Valentine's Jamboree Concert in Nairobi, Kenya. Poco Lee cites Naira Marley and Zlatan as major influences in his career. Aside his dancing, Lee is also a versed singer with many singles to his credit. He is credited with introducing Portable to Olamide, thus helping to launch his career, and also linked Black Sherif with Burna Boy.

== Controversy ==
Poco Lee was called out in 2023 for not publicly paying tribute to late MohBad, a close music friend whose concert Lee had headlined not long before his death. He trended on twitter over days as Nigerians on twitter, angry and frustrated over the circumstances around the singer's death, called out his industry friends to take a more proactive and critical stance for justice.

In December 2022, Poco Lee was seen in a viral video engaged in a scuffle with policemen on the streets of Lagos. The reasons for the fracas was not disclosed and the police never issued a statement on whether anyone was arrested or not.

On Wednesday, July 13, 2023, Poco Lee, Bella Shmurda, Odumodublvck and other musicians were reportedly attacked with guns and other weapons by campus cultists at the Lagos State University, Ojo, during a homecoming concert titled "Party with Poco Lee". This was first reported on social media and then picked up by mainstream media. The Lagos State University management however debunked these claims, and clarified that the concert management had sold tickets in excess of the capacity of the hall. Over 10,000 tickets were sold for a 2,500 capacity hall, creating chaos and frustration amongst concert-goers, who were turned away by security due to fears of a stampede, leading to arguments and the scuffles caught on video.

In 2021, Habeeb Okikiola popularly known as Portable, a Nigerian artiste called out Poco Lee in a viral video, for collecting his money and taking credit for their song. Portable later apologized to Poco Lee, saying "kindly forgive the street in me". In 2026, he was accused of rape and was arrested in the United Kingdom.

== Discography ==
Poco Lee is credited with many singles such as "Jokoriko" (2024), "Unleash" (2023), "Obirin-Ahh 2.0" (2022), "Otilo-Izz Gone" (2022), "Chop Up" (2022), "Yard" (2022), "ZaZoo Zehh" (2022), "Commot Body Jor" ft Big Wiz (2021), and "Commot Body Jor" (2021).
