= Mavo (musician) =

Nigerian singer (born 2003)

- Also known as: Kilo; Mavo Swago
- Born: Oseremen Marvin Ukanigbe; 1 November 2003 (age 23); Ekpoma, Edo State, Nigeria
- Genres: Street pop; Afro-pop; Afrobeats
- Occupations: Singer; songwriter
- Instrument: Vocals
- Years active: 2023–present
- Labels: Kilogbede Records; Inner Circle Records

Oseremen Marvin Ukanigbe (born 1 November 2003), known professionally as Mavo, is a Nigerian singer-songwriter. He rose to popularity in 2025 with the release of the single "Escaladizzy", followed by "Shakabulizzy", "Money Constant" with fellow singer Wizkid, and "Body (Danz)" with CKay, the latter of which became his first number-one song in Nigeria.

Mavo's debut mixtape Ukanigbe (2023) peaked at number eight on the TurnTable Top 100 Albums following his rise to popularity and his fourth mixtape Kilometer II (2025) peaked at number four. His fifth mixtape Business (2026) peaked at number three. He is known for his unique use of slang in his music.

== Early life and education ==
Oseremen Marvin Ukanigbe was born on 1 November 2003 in Ekpoma, Edo State, Nigeria, but moved to Warri, Delta State as a child, before returning to Edo to attend secondary school as a boarding student. Mavo attended Lumen Christi International High School and he joined their music club and got the nickname "Mavo". Students in the club would meet every Friday to perform their music, and Mavo did so to positive reactions from his peers.

As of 2026, Mavo is in his final year of university, studying optometry at Afe Babalola University.

== Career ==
=== 2023-2025: Career beginnings ===
Mavo began pursuing a music career in 2023, releasing his first track, "Ukanigbe", on his twentieth birthday. On 1 December 2023, his debut mixtape of the same name, Ukanigbe was released. This featured the sleeper hit "Tumo Weto", which reached number one on Apple Music Nigeria in January 2026, and peaked at number thirteen on the TurnTable Top 100 Songs.

On 1 April 2024, Mavo released the mixtape Sanko (She Always Needs Kilogbede One). On 1 July the deluxe edition released. On 9 August he released the joint EP Kobilou Kilobizzy alongside singer Kobilou, whom he met at university. On 1 April 2025 Mavo released his third solo mixtape Kilometer.

=== 2025-2026: Rise to popularity, Kilometer II ===
On 6 June 2025, Mavo released the track "Escaladizzy" with Wave$tar. The song began gaining traction on social media platforms, and received a remix on 22 July with Zlatan, Shallipopi, and Ayra Starr. On 5 September 2025 the single "Shakabulizzy" was released, which received a remix with Davido the next month.

Mavo's fourth mixtape Kilometer II was released on 26 September 2025, peaking at number four on the TurnTable Top 100. On 23 October the single "Body (Danz)" with CKay released, and reached number-one on the TurnTable Top 100, becoming Mavo's first chart-topper. On 28 November he appeared on the track "Wuse Tu" by Zaylevelten.

Mavo began 2026 with a continued release of singles such as "Use Me" on Valentine's Day, "Aura Salad" on 20 February, and "Mofe" on 6 March. "Aura Salad" peaked at number nine on the Turntable Top 100.

=== 2026-present: Business ===
On 27 February 2026, Mavo appeared on the song "Big Bum Bum" by Kidd Carder, which peaked at number two on the TurnTable Top 100. This was followed by the single "BB Lifestyle" with Kilogbede Records signee SSSoundgawd, which debuted at number 15 on the chart on 31 July 2026.

On 24 July, Mavo released his fifth mixtape, Business. It debuted at number three on the TurnTable Top 100, making it his highest-charting project. Three songs from the mixtape, "Ice Cream", "Superwoman", and "Business" all debuted on the Top 100 chart, at numbers 17, 42, and 51 respectively.

On 4 September 2026, the single "Find My Babe" released. It peaked at number one on the Apple Music Nigeria Top Songs chart, becoming his sixth number one that year, following "BB Lifestyle", "Big Bum Bum", "Mofe", "Tumo Weto", and "Money Constant". This tied Asake's record for the most number ones that year. On 18 September he appeared on the track "Sista Bozza" by DJHarvey. On 16 October he released the track "Shenk Me" with DJ 808. On 23 October he released the single "Goyard".

== Discography ==
==== Mixtapes ====
- Ukanigbe (2023)
- Sanko (She Always Needs Kilogbede One) (2024)
- Kilometer (2025)
- Kilometer II (2025)
- Business (2026)

==== Extended plays ====
- Kobilou Kilobizzy (with Kobilou) (2024)
- Sanko II (Deluxe) (2024)

== Artistry ==
Mavo has listed Wande Coal and Duncan Mighty as musical influences. He is noted for his unique slang, called "Bizzylingua". Mavo's music is described as a mix of Afrobeats and rap, which is referred to by Mavo as "Burbur", or "burti" music.
