= Born in the Wild Tour =

2024 concert tour by Tems

- Tour by Tems
- promotional poster
- Location: North America; Europe; Australia; Africa; Asia
- Associated album: Born in the Wild
- Start date: June 11, 2024
- End date: November 15, 2024
- Legs: 4
- No. of shows: 41
- Supporting acts: Naomi Sharon; Godwin; Lekan
- Website: www.leadingvibe.com

Born in the Wild Tour is the debut concert tour by Nigerian singer Tems in support of her debut studio album, Born in the Wild (2024). The supporting acts are Dutch singer Naomi Sharon and Nigerian American singer Godwin. The European leg of the tour commenced on June 11, 2024, in Eventim Apollo, London. The North American leg of the tour commenced on August 22, 2024, in Miami and ended on October 10, 2024.

== Background ==
In a tweet in 2022, Tems announced that her debut studio album was scheduled for release in 2023. The album was delayed for unknown reasons with Tems teasing the album and instead releasing two singles "Me & U" and "Not an Angel", which marked her first solo music output since 2021 excluding her cover of Bob Marley's "No Woman, No Cry" for the Black Panther: Wakanda Forever soundtrack. In March 2024, Tems told Billboard magazine that the album has been completed and that it would released in 2024. In April, Tems announced the release date alongside the world tour spanning four continents, with venues for Africa and Asia yet to be announced. In December 2024, Dates for the Africa leg of the tour was announced with scheduled concert in South Africa and Rwanda. The Rwanda tour stop was canceled due to the insecurities issues arising from tension between The Democratic Republic of Congo and Rwanda.

== Set list ==
The following set list is obtained from the June 11, 2024 show in London. It is not intended to represent all dates throughout the tour.

1. "Higher"
2. “Avoid Things”
3. “Replay”
4. “Damages”
5. “Wickedest”
6. “Turn Me Up”
7. “Burning”
8. “Ice T”
9. “Forever”
10. “Born In The Wild” (Played From Tape)
11. “Boy O Boy”
12. “Found”
13. “Unfortunate”
14. “Not An Angel”
15. “Love Me JeJe”
16. “Essence” (Wizkid cover)
17. “Me & U”
18. “Crazy Tings”
19. “Free Mind”

== Tours dates ==
Born in the Wild - World Tour
Date	City	Country	Venue	Opener
June 11	London	England	Eventim Apollo	-
June 12	London	England	Eventim Apollo	-
June 15	Paris	France	L'Olympia	-
June 16	Paris	France	L'Olympia	-
June 29	Pilton	England	Worthy Farm	-
June 30	Laken	Belgium	Atomiumsquare	-
July 4	Oslo	Norway	Rockefeller Music Hall	-
July 6	Roskilde	Denmark	Dyrskuepladsen	-
July 8	Berlin	Germany	Tempodrom	Godwin
July 10	Cologne	Germany	Carlswerk Victoria	-
July 12	Amsterdam	Netherlands	Paradiso	-
July 13	Rotterdam	Netherlands	Ahoy	-
July 16	Montreux	Switzerland	Casino de Montreux	-
July 21	Bridgetown	Barbados	National Botanical Gardens	-
August 7	Zambujeira do Mar	Portugal	Herdade da Casa Branca	-
August 9	Gothenburg	Sweden	Slottsskogen	-
August 16	London	England	Victoria Park	-
August 22	Miami Beach	United States	The Fillmore Miami Beach at Jackie Gleason Theater	Naomi Sharon
August 24	Orlando	United States	Hard Rock Live	Naomi Sharon
August 26	Dallas	United States	South Side Ballroom	Naomi Sharon
August 28	Houston	United States	713 Music Hall	Naomi Sharon
August 30	Atlanta	United States	Coca-Cola Roxy	Naomi Sharon
September 1	Washington D.C.	United States	The Anthem	Naomi Sharon
September 3	Philadelphia	United States	The Met	Naomi Sharon
September 5	New York City	United States	Radio City Music Hall	Naomi Sharon
September 7	Toronto	Canada	History	Naomi Sharon
September 11	Boston	United States	Agganis Arena	Lekan
September 13	Montreal	Canada	Olympia Theatre	Lekan
September 15	Chicago	United States	Byline Bank Aragon Ballroom	Lekan
September 17	Denver	United States	The Mission Ballroom	Lekan
September 22	Vancouver	United States	Queen Elizabeth Theatre	Lekan
September 25	Seattle	United States	The Showbox	Lekan
September 27	San Francisco	United States	The Warfield	Lekan
September 29	Las Vegas	United States	The Theater at Virgin Hotels Las Vegas	Lekan
October 1	Los Angeles	United States	The Greek Theatre	Lekan
November 9	Melbourne	Australia	Margaret Court Arena	-
November 12	Brisbane	Australia	The Fortitude Music Hall	-
November 15	Moore Park	Australia	Hondern Pavilion	-
December 13	Dubai	United Arab Emirates	Dubai International Financial Centre	-
March 20	Johannesburg	South Africa	The Dome	Elaine
