= Last Lap =

Studio album by Rod Wave
- Released: October 11, 2024
- Genre: Hip-hop
- Length: 67:13
- Label: Alamo
- Producers: Akachi; Andrew Levia; APGoKrazy; Berge.af; ChildBoy; Chris Made; CocoBeatSzn; Colorado; DatBoiGetro; Djaxx; Dmac; Draka; EELmatic; Exuising; Fasbeats; FlexOnDaTrack; Foreverolling; Gabe Lucas; Geo Vocals; Isaac Junior; JB; Keely; Kyris; LayZ; LondnBlue; MarsGawd; Mattazik Muzik; Michael Makho; Neeko Made This; Shaad K'Rounds; T Five; TnTXD; Train; TrillGotJuice; Trillo Beatz; Uncle Cameron; Vile; Will Michael; Wonderyo

Rod Wave chronology
| Nostalgia (2023) | Last Lap (2024) | Don't Look Down (2026) |

Singles from Last lap
- 1. "Passport Junkie" Released: September 14, 2024; 2. "Fall Fast in Love" Released: September 27, 2024

Last Lap is the sixth studio album by American rapper and singer Rod Wave. It was released on October 11, 2024, through Alamo Records. The album features guest appearances from Be Charlotte, Lil Baby, Lil Yachty, Rylo Rodriguez, and Wild Rivers, while its production was primarily handled by Dmac and TnTXD, with support from ChildBoy, Chris Made, EELmatic, MarsGawd, FlexOnDaTrack, Foreverolling, Mattazik Muzik, TrillGotJuice, Uncle Cameron, and several other producers. The album served as a follow-up to his fifth studio album, Nostalgia (2023).

Last Lap received mixed reception from music critics who valued Green's lyricism and vocals on the record. It debuted at number two on the US Billboard 200 chart, selling 127,000 album-equivalent units, 2,000 of which were pure album sales. The album serves as Green's seventh consecutive top ten on the chart and makes him the only artist other than Taylor Swift to chart in the top ten each year from 2019 to 2024, and seventeen of the album's twenty-three tracks charted on the Billboard Hot 100. It was supported by two official singles: "Passport Junkie" and "Fall Fast in Love".

== Background and recording ==
Upon the release of Last Lap, Green appeared in an interview with Montreality in which he spoke about the "ups and downs" he went through while creating the album. When asked how he's grown since the release of SoulFly (2021), Green responded:

I mean, shit, yeah. Hell, yeah. Every day a nigga grow, bro. Every day a nigga grow. I done grown a lot since then. Sometimes I look back at my interview and, like, just knowing how much I grown since then, I look back at my interview, and I like, 'Damn'. You know what I'm saying? I can't believe I was feeling that way, though. I just remember where I was at in that moment, you know what I'm saying? And I just. Yeah, I done grown a lot. I'm growing every day and shit. You know what I'm saying? You grow every day. Every day I learn something new, I take a step closer, you know?

== Release and promotion ==
On November 21, 2023, Green released the single "After it All" exclusively to his YouTube channel, however, it was almost immediately deleted due to sample clearance issues. Furthermore, one of Green's engineers took their Instagram live to state that his label, Alamo Records, delayed the release of the single due to label-mate Lil Durk dropping the same night.

On March 31, 2024, Green was arrested in Manatee County, Florida on two counts of illegally possessing a firearm or ammunition as a convicted felon, related to a shooting in St. Petersburg, Florida. The police claimed that the shooting was gang-related and the three men arrested alongside Green were alleged gang members. Despite this, Green was later released because the information about him being a felon was inaccurate. On April 16, Green released a re-recording of his December 2018 track, "Numb" from his Hunger Games 3 mixtape, alongside a new music video. In May, Green took to his Twitter to announce his break-up with his long-time girlfriend and to ask producers to stop sending him "sad" beats, and instead requested Future-type beats. As a result, record producer close to Future, Metro Boomin quote Tweeted Green, suggesting that he'd have involvement on the album. In June he posted an Instagram story in which he stated that it "hurt" him to make the project: "This fuckin project hurt so bad bra. But I'ma give it ta y'all". In the same story, he teased the album's tracklist, tour dates, and merchandise to be "loading". On June 21, Green released the track "Lonely" exclusively to his YouTube channel, however, deleted it shortly after. In September 2024, Green went live on his Instagram and revealed that the album would feature guest appearances from Drake, Lil Baby, Lil Yachty, and Rylo Rodriguez. Shortly after the live, he shared a snippet of a track titled "Best Friends" with Drake.

On September 4, Green announced his United States Last Lap Tour, supported by Moneybagg Yo, Toosii, Lil Poppa, Dess Dior, and Eelmatic. The thirty-six-stop tour will begin on October 19 in Phoenix, Arizona and will conclude on December 18 in Fort Lauderdale, Florida. On September 14, Green released the album's lead single, "Passport Junkie". On September 23, Green took to YouTube to release a new song titled "Letting It Go" accompanied by a music video. The song interpolates lyrics from Best Thing I Never Had by Beyonce. The song and video were deleted off YouTube quickly after release, and the song would not be featured on the album. On September 26, Green officially announced the release of the album for October 11. The following day, he released the album's second single, "Fall Fast in Love". Following Green's album announcement, Memphis, Tennessee rapper, GloRilla commented on the post regarding her debut album, Glorious dropping the same day as Last Lap, which she announced a week prior. GloRilla replied to Green's announcement via a comment: "Why DF Would You Drop On My Day I'm Finna Tweak Out". Following her comment, Green took to his Instagram story to share a picture of the two in the studio while confirming that we wouldn't move his release date: "La twin drop same night". On October 9, the album's official tracklist was revealed by Alamo Records via Instagram. Upon the release of the tracklist, Green received minor backlash after fans saw that Drake and Morgan Wallen weren't featured on the project.

Following the release of the album, on October 12, Green released the official music video for the project's fourth cut, "25". On October 25, 2024, in an episode of Billboard's Billboard Unfiltered, Carl Lamarre, Trevor Anderson, Damien Scott, and Kyle Denis spoke about Green and the album, stating that he's carved his own lane and is in the "Big 3" oh Hip-Hop.

== Artwork ==
The official artwork for Last Lap sees Green in the midst of performing with his back to the artwork. He's holding the microphone in his right hand and the microphone stand in his left hand. On Green's left wrist is seen a Richard Mille RM 67-01 Automatic Extra Flat. On the back of his t-shirt is a portrait of Green and his late uncle and manager, the founder of Hit House Entertainment, Derek "Dee" Lane. The artwork pays homage to his late uncle whose death was confirmed by Green on July 3, 2024, through his Instagram:

I love u so much pop I'm sorry they prayed we fall. I follow u every where l would follow u to heaven but nigga we started this shit I know how y' mind work a thousand thoughts a min I swear when I was a kid I thought u was bigger the da president nigga u is gone always be da largest nigga da sickest nigga and any nigga say u ain't doa [dead on arrival].

== Critical reception ==
Professional ratings
Review scores
| Source | Rating |
|---|---|
| AllMusic | 2.5/5 stars |
| Ratings Game Music | 76% |

Last Lap received mixed reviews from critics. AllMusic's TiVo Staff wrote that the album is "another collection of heartbroken melodies, yearning hooks, sad piano loops, and just enough pop lift to keep the entire thing from falling into utter despair". He stated that Green focuses "on songs of loss, social anxiety, and emotional pain", however, "he's done very little to expand on his sound or differentiate one song or album from the next". Writing for Ratings Game Music, in a positive review, Quincy wrote that on the album, Green "stays true to his emotional core, delivering the heartfelt music his fans expect" and that his lyrics "feel more balanced and optimistic compared to his earlier work". He stated that Green's topics of "lost love, loneliness, and dealing with the repercussions" of the streets, alongside his rapping about "his newfound success, lavish lifestyle, and treating women he values" show his growth and maturity as an artist. HotNewHipHop's Zachary Horvath wrote that the album sees Green "[feature] your typical painful love songs as well as songs about his mental health", and that at times, he "come[s] across as unsure about his own life and how all of these tragedies happening around him will affect him in the long term".

== Commercial performance ==
In the United States, Last Lap debuted at number two on the Billboard 200, earning 127,000 album-equivalent units (including 2,000 in pure sales) in its first week. It became Wave's seventh top ten on the chart. The album accumulated a total of 173.35 million on-demand streams of its songs. With the release of Last Lap, Rod Wave became the only artist other than Taylor Swift to have an album peak within the top ten of the Billboard 200 every year between the years of 2019 to 2024. In its second week, the album fell to number four on the Billboard 200, moving 67,000 album-equivalent units. In its third week, the album fell to number five on the Billboard 200, moving 51,000 album-equivalent units.

== Track listing ==
Last Lap track listing
| No. | Title | Writer(s) | Producer(s) | Length |
|---|---|---|---|---|
| 1. | "Turtle Race" | Rodarius Green; Thomas Horton; Felix Govaerts; Kyris D'Asia | TnTXD; FlexOnDaTrack; Kyris | 3:06 |
| 2. | "Last Lap" | Green; Trentay Robinson; Brandon Lake; Aaron Moses; Doe Jones; Ryan Ofei | Trillo Beatz | 4:08 |
| 3. | "Apply Pressure" | Green; Horton; Govaerts; Mohamed Ghallab; Will Michael | TnTXD; FlexOnDaTrack; CocoBeatSzn; Will Michael | 2:55 |
| 4. | "25" | Green; Lee Spight; Temilade Openiyi; Seyi Sodimu; Ronald Banful; Akano Wisdom | EELmatic | 3:00 |
| 5. | "Fuck the Fame" (featuring Lil Baby and Lil Yachty) | Green; Dominique Jones; Miles McCollum; Deshawn Jackson; Eamon Doyle; Kirk Robinson; Yared Williams | ChildBoy | 3:03 |
| 6. | "Federal Nightmares" | Green; Hunter Brown; Matthew Robinson | Akachi; Mattazik Muzik; Vile | 3:08 |
| 7. | "Angel with an Attitude" | Green; Horton; Fedor Sommerfeld; Justin Bradbury; Gabriel Lucas | TnTXD; Fasbeats; JB; Gabe Lucas | 3:15 |
| 8. | "The Best" | Green; Spight; Donald Lawrence | EELmatic | 2:35 |
| 9. | "Never Mind" | Green; Horton; David McDowell; Mikhail Makhinko | TnTXD; Dmac; Michael Makho | 2:50 |
| 10. | "Mike" | Green; Horton; McDowell; D'Asia | TnTXD; Dmac; Kyris | 2:35 |
| 11. | "Even Love" | Green; Horton; Sommerfeld; Archie Patmore; Rashaad Green | TnTXD; Fasbeats; APGoKrazy; Shaad K'Rounds | 2:34 |
| 12. | "Waited 2 Late" (with Wild Rivers) | Green; Devan Glover; Khalid Yassein; Andrew Oliver; Horton; McDowell; Makhinko | TnTXD; Dmac; Michael Makho | 2:40 |
| 13. | "D.A.R.E." | Green; McDowell; Benjamin Hubble; Bryan Beachley | Dmac; DatBoiGetro; LayZ; Train | 2:31 |
| 14. | "The Mess They Made" | Green; Horton; Michael Roberge; Cameron Hubler; Jeffrey Jones Jr. | TnTXD; Berge.af; Uncle Cameron; Foreverolling | 2:45 |
| 15. | "Karma" | Green; Spight | EELmatic | 2:54 |
| 16. | "Spaceship" | Green; Horton; McDowell; Josh Joseph | TnTXD; Dmac; MarsGawd | 2:54 |
| 17. | "Lost in Love" (with Be Charlotte) | Green; Charlotte Brimner; Horton; Devin Wood; Andrey Letunov; Scotty Anderson; Ciaran McEneny | TnTXD; Djaxx; Andrew Levia | 2:43 |
| 18. | "Bachelor" | Green; Tarkan Kozluklu; Govaerts; Niko Schneider; Aubrey Graham; Noah Shebib; Francis Starlite | T Five; FlexOnDaTrack; Neeko Baby | 2:25 |
| 19. | "Scared Love" | Green; Horton; Janarious Wheeler; Keely Maynard; Joseph Tounge; Sterling van Reynolds; Antonio Ramos; Evgeny Ermakov | TnTXD; Colorado; Keely; LondnBlue; TrillGotJuice | 3:05 |
| 20. | "Fall Fast in Love" | Green; Kozluklu; Christopher Fizer; Govaerts; Schneider | T Five; Chris Made; FlexOnDaTrack; Neeko Baby | 2:52 |
| 21. | "Passport Junkie" | Green; Kozluklu; Kirill Vyacheslavovich; Darius Poviliunas | T Five; Exuising; Wonderyo | 2:27 |
| 22. | "IRan" | Green; Horton; Bradbury; Wood; Robert Smorra; Georgia Boyden | TnTXD; JB; Djaxx; Draka; Geo Vocals | 2:58 |
| 23. | "Jersey Numbers" (featuring Rylo Rodriguez) | Green; Ryan Adams; Horton; Bradbury; Isaac Agyapong | TnTXD; JB; Isaac Junior | 3:50 |
| Total length: | | | | 67:13 |

Sample credits

- "Last Lap" contains samples of "Keep Praying", written by Brandon Lake, Aaron Moses, Doe Jones, and Ryan Ofei, as performed by Maverick City Music, Mav City Gospel Choir, Ryan Ofei, and DOE.
- "25" contains samples of "Love Me JeJe", written by Temilade Openiyi, Seyi Sodimu, Ronald Banful, and Akano Wisdom, as performed by Tems.
- "Fuck Fame" contains samples of "On & On", written by Eamon Doyle, Kirk Robinson, and Yared Williams, as performed by Eamon.
- "Federal Nightmares" contains samples of "B.G. and DJ Drama Speak", written by Christopher Dorsey and Tyree Simmons, as performed by B.G. and DJ Drama.
- "The Best" contains samples of "The Best Is Yet to Come", written by Donald Lawrence, as performed by Lawrence and The Tri-City Singers.
- "Lost in Love" contains an interpolation of "Smooth Criminal", written and performed by Michael Jackson.
- "Bachelor" contains samples of "Karaoke", written by Aubrey Graham, Noah Shebib, and Francis Starlite, as performed by Drake.

== Personnel ==
Musicians

- Rod Wave – vocals
- Kasey Rashel Sims – additional vocals (4)
- Lil Baby – rap vocals (5)
- Lil Yachty – rap vocals (5)

Technical

- Travis Harrington – mixing (1–8, 19–23)
- Raymond Argueta – mixing, recording (9)
- Benjamin Mathew – recording (5)
- Zeus Negrete – recording (5)

== Charts ==
=== Weekly charts ===
Weekly chart performance for Last Lap
| Chart (2024) | Peak position |
|---|---|
| Canadian Albums (Billboard) | 34 |
| Dutch Albums (Album Top 100) | 91 |
| New Zealand Albums (RMNZ) | 33 |
| Nigerian Albums (TurnTable) | 9 |
| UK Albums (Official Charts) | 63 |
| US Billboard 200 | 2 |
| US Top R&B/Hip-Hop Albums (Billboard) | 1 |

=== Year-end charts ===
Year-end chart performance for Last Lap
| Chart (2025) | Position |
|---|---|
| US Billboard 200 | 29 |
| US Top R&B/Hip-Hop Albums (Billboard) | 10 |

== Certifications ==
| Region | Certification | Certified units/sales |
|---|---|---|
| United States (RIAA) | Platinum | 1,000,000^{‡} |
^{‡} Sales+streaming figures based on certification alone.

== Release history ==
Release dates and formats for Last Lap
| Region | Date | Label(s) | Format(s) | Edition(s) | Ref. |
|---|---|---|---|---|---|
| Various | October 11, 2024 | Alamo | Digital download; streaming | Standard | |
| United States | November 1, 2024 | Alamo | LP | Standard | |

== See also ==
- 2024 in hip hop music
