= Born in the Wild =

Studio album by Tems
- Released: 7 June 2024
- Recorded: 2021–2024
- Genres: R&B; Afrobeats
- Length: 54:26
- Labels: RCA; Since '93
- Producers: Tems; GuiltyBeatz; Sarz; Spax; P2J; London; DameDame

Tems chronology
If Orange Was a Place (2021)	Born in the Wild (2024)	Love Is a Kingdom (2025)

Singles from Born in the Wild
- 1. "Me & U" Released: 5 October 2023; 2. "Love Me JeJe" Released: 26 April 2024; 3. "Burning" Released: 7 June 2024

Born in the Wild is the debut studio album by Nigerian singer Tems. It was released on 7 June 2024, via RCA Records and Since '93. The album was supported by the singles "Me & U", "Love Me JeJe" and "Burning". Born in the Wild features guest appearances from J. Cole and Asake. Its production was handled by Tems, GuiltyBeatz, Sarz, P2J, London, Spax, and DameDame. In promotion of the album, Tems embarked on the Born in the Wild Tour.

Born in the Wild was a commercial success, reaching the top thirty in the United Kingdom, Netherlands and Switzerland. In the United States, it peaked at fifty-six, becoming the highest charting album by a Nigerian female artist. Born in the Wild was nominated for Best Global Music Album at the 67th Annual Grammy Awards. Two songs from the album received nominations: "Burning" for Best R&B Song and "Love Me JeJe" for Best African Music Performance, winning the latter.

== Background ==
In 2020, Tems independently released her debut extended play For Broken Ears. That same year, she signed with RCA Records and released her second extended play, If Orange Was a Place. In 2021, Tems received international recognition after being featured on Wizkid's "Essence" single. Shortly afterwards, her song "Free Mind", from her debut EP For Broken Ears, impacted Rhythmic contemporary radio as a single and charted in the United States. She further achieved success with her collaborations with Future on "Wait for U" alongside Drake, Beyoncé on "Move" alongside Grace Jones and as a songwriter on Rihanna's "Lift Me Up", the latter earned her an Academy Award and Golden Globe Award nominations.

In a tweet in 2022, Tems announced that her debut studio album was scheduled for release in 2023. The album was delayed for unknown reasons with Tems teasing the album and instead releasing two singles "Me & U" and "Not an Angel", which marked her first solo music output since 2021 excluding her cover of Bob Marley's "No Woman, No Cry" for the Black Panther: Wakanda Forever soundtrack. In March 2024, Tems told Billboard magazine that the album has been completed and that it would released in 2024. Shortly afterwards, a private listening session for the album was held in Lagos, Nigeria and later Los Angeles and London.

== Promotion and release ==
While performing at her debut Coachella set in April, Tems officially announced that the album was ready and performed a rendition of "Love Me JeJe", an unreleased song off the album. A day later, the album's title and release window of May was revealed along with a trailer, which featured a snippet of the title track.

"Love Me JeJe" was released on 26 April 2024 as the first single off the album. A few weeks later, Tems officially announced the release date of 7 June 2024. In May, Tems appeared on the American late-night talk show The Tonight Show Starring Jimmy Fallon in May 2024, her debut appearance on the series to promote the album, performing a medley of "Love Me JeJe" and the album's title track "Born in the Wild". On 30 May, Tems unveiled the album track list consisting of eighteen tracks; sixteen songs and two interludes. The track list further revealed J. Cole and Asake as guest features on the album.

On 3 June, Tems further appeared on NPR Tiny Desk Concert part of a series celebrating Black Music Month to promote the album performing the then unreleased song "Unfortunate" and "Forever" from the album. Three days later, the album was released on all streaming platforms.

As scheduled Tems began her Born in the Wild Tour on June 11, her birthday starting with the European leg at the sold out Eventim Apollo in London and continued performing at tour stops across Europe, Australia and North America. The North American leg of the tour commenced on August 22, 2024, in Miami and ended on October 10, 2024.

== Critical reception ==
Professional ratings
Aggregate scores
Source	Rating
Metacritic	86/100
Review scores
Source	Rating
African Folder	8.4/10
Clash	8/10
The Guardian	4/5 stars
The Independent	4/5 stars
NME	5/5 stars
Spin	4.5/5 stars
Pitchfork	7.8/10
Rolling Stone	8/10

Born in the Wild received widespread critical acclaim across major publications both in Africa and globally for Tems' vocal delivery, lyrics and presentation. On the review aggregator website Metacritic, the album received a weighted average score of 86 from 100 based on 7 reviews, indicating "universal acclaim".

NME gave the album a 100 rating stating that "From Highlife to hip-hop, this stunning debut exemplifies West Africa's rich musical diversity via the Beyoncé and Drake collaborator's fluid approach to genre." Robin Murray reviewing for Clash noted that "Closing with" Hold On", this is a rich, velvet-smooth experience, and you're left to wonder who her peers truly are. The magnificence of Lauryn Hill? The success of Sade? Tems is out there in a lane of her own." Pitchfork wrote that "On her adventurous and melancholic full-length debut, the Nigerian pop star re-asserts herself as an imaginative producer and the author of her own lore."

=== Year-end rankings ===
Born in the Wild appeared on several publications' rankings of the best albums of 2024, including top ten features on Entertainment Weekly, Los Angeles Times,The Hollywood Reporter and The FADER. Billboard ranked the album as the second best R&B album of 2024.

Select year-end rankings of Born in the Wild
Publication	List	Rank	Ref.
Billboard	The 50 Best Albums of 2024	18	
Billboard	The 10 Best R&B Albums of 2024	2	
Business Insider	The best albums of 2024	11	
Crack	Top 50 Albums of 2024	12	
Complex	The 50 Best Albums of 2024	14	
Entertainment Weekly	10 Best Albums of 2024	10	
The Fader	The 50 Best Albums of 2024	8	
Dazed	Best Albums of 2024	19	
The Hollywood Reporter	The 10 Best Albums of 2024	6	
Los Angeles Times	The 20 Best Albums of 2024	6	
NME	The best albums of 2024	41	
NPR	The 50 Best Albums of 2024	—N/a	
Rolling Stone	The 100 Best Albums of 2024	37	
Uproxx	The Best Albums Of 2024	—N/a	
Variety	The Best 20 Albums of 2024 (So Far)	17	

== Commercial performance ==
Born in the Wild achieved several accomplishments and broke a series of records; the first for a Nigerian female artist. On the US overall Billboard 200 chart and it debuted at number fifty six with 16,500 equivalent album units sold. It became the highest charting album by a Nigerian female artist on the chart surpassing Ayra Starr's The Year I Turned 21. On the genre specific Top R&B Albums chart, Born in the Wild debuted at number five. In Canada, the album peaked at number fifty two.

Across Europe, Born in the Wild debuted in the top thirty in the UK Album Chart, Netherlands and Switzerland, in the latter peaking at number twenty two. The album charted on the Portuguese Album chart becoming the first Nigerian project to enter the chart. In Nigeria, the album peaked at number three on TurnTable Albums, becoming Tems first top ten project on the chart.

== Track listing ==
Born in the Wild track listing
No.	Title	Writer(s)	Producer(s)	Length
1.	"Born in the Wild"	Temilade Openiyi; Ronald Banful	Tems; GuiltyBeatz	2:16
2.	"Special Baby" (Interlude)	Openiyi	Tems	1:28
3.	"Burning"	Openiyi; Banful	Tems; GuiltyBeatz	2:55
4.	"Wickedest"	Openiyi; Banful; Edson Tayoro; Salif Traoré	Tems; GuiltyBeatz	2:36
5.	"Love Me JeJe"	Openiyi; Banful; Akano Samuel; Seyi Sodimu	GuiltyBeatz; Spax	2:58
6.	"Get It Right" (featuring Asake)	Openiyi; Ahmed Ololade; Osabuohien Osaretin	Sarz	3:19
7.	"Ready"	Openiyi; Banful	GuiltyBeatz	3:45
8.	"Gangsta"	Openiyi; Samuel; Andrew Saidenberg; Arnold Roman; Diana King	Spax	2:41
9.	"Unfortunate"	Openiyi; Banful	GuiltyBeatz	3:39
10.	"Boy O Boy"	Openiyi; Banful; Nsikak David	GuiltyBeatz; David	2:52
11.	"Forever"	Openiyi; Banful; DameDame	GuiltyBeatz; DameDame	3:16
12.	"Free Fall" (featuring J. Cole)	Openiyi; Jermaine Cole; Richard Isong	P2J	3:12
13.	"Voices in My Head" (Interlude)	Openiyi	Tems	1:27
14.	"Turn Me Up"	Openiyi; Michael Hunter	London	3:36
15.	"Me & U"	Openiyi; Banful	GuiltyBeatz	3:12
16.	"T-Unit"	Openiyi; Banful	Tems; GuiltyBeatz	3:03
17.	"You in My Face"	Openiyi; Banful	GuiltyBeatz	4:28
18.	"Hold On"	Openiyi; Banful	Tems; GuiltyBeatz	4:05
Total length:				54:26

Sample credits

- "Wickedest" contains a sample of "Premier Gaou", written by Edson Tayoro and Salif Traoré, as performed by the Magic System.
- "Love Me JeJe" contains a sample of "Love Me Jeje", written by Seyi Sodimu, as performed by the latter.
- "Gangsta" contains a sample of "L-L-Lies" written and performed by Diana King

== Personnel ==
Vocalists

- Tems – primary artist
- Asake – featured artist (6)
- J Cole – featured artist (12)

Production

- Tems – production (2, 13), co-production (1, 3, 4, 16, 18)
- GuiltyBeatz – production (7, 9,15), co-production (1, 3, 4 —6, 10, 11, 16—18)
- Spax – co-production (5, 8)
- London – co-production (14)
- Sarz –co-production (6)
- Dame Dame – co-production (11)
- David – co-production (10)
- P2J – co-production (12)

Engineering

- Gerhard Westphalen – mastering
- Spax – mixing
- Ikon – mixing (5, 7, 9, 14, 15)

== Charts ==
Chart performance for Born in the Wild
Chart (2024)	Peak position
Australian Hip Hop/R&B Albums (ARIA)	31
Belgian Albums (Ultratop Flanders)	86
Belgian Albums (Ultratop Wallonia)	135
Canadian Albums (Billboard)	52
Dutch Albums (Album Top 100)	29
French Albums (SNEP)	74
Nigerian Albums (TurnTable)	3
Portuguese Albums (AFP)	68
Swiss Albums (Schweizer Hitparade)	22
UK Albums (Official Charts)	25
UK R&B Albums (Official Charts)	18
US Billboard 200	56
US Top R&B/Hip-Hop Albums (Billboard)	16
US World Albums (Billboard)	2

== Certifications ==
Certifications for Born in the Wild
Region	Certification	Certified units/sales
New Zealand (RMNZ)	Gold	7,500^{‡}
United Kingdom (BPI)	Silver	60,000^{‡}
^{‡} Sales+streaming figures based on certification alone.
