= Love Is a Kingdom =

EP by Tems
- Released: 21 November 2025
- Genres: Alternative R&B, Afrobeats
- Length: 19:58
- Labels: Since '93; RCA
- Producers: Tems; AoD; Guiltybeatz; Jonah Christian; Rob Bisel; London; V-Ron

Tems chronology
Born in the Wild (2024)	Love Is a Kingdom (2025)

Singles from Love Is a Kingdom
- 1. "What You Need" Released: 21 November 2025

Love Is a Kingdom is the third extended play by Nigerian singer, songwriter and producer Tems. It was surprise-released on 21 November 2025 by RCA Records and Since '93. It marks Tems first solo release since her debut studio album Born in the Wild (2024). The EP was produced by Tems, GuiltyBeatz, AoD, Jonah Christian, Rob Bisel, London and V-Ron. The EP received a nomination at the 69th Annual Grammy Awards for Best Global Music Album.

== Background and release ==
Following the release of her EPs For Broken Ears (2020) and If Orange Was a Place (2021), Tems released her debut album Born in the Wild (2024).

In 2025, she teased that her second album will be released in 2026 at her concert. In November, Tems announced a surprise listening party inviting fans to sign up for the events which took place in Los Angeles. The seven-track EP was surprise-released the next morning without any prior announcement.

== Critical reception ==
Professional ratings
Review scores
Source	Rating
African Folder	8.8/10
NME	4/5 stars
Pitchfork	7.6/10
Premium Times	8/10
Rolling Stone	4/5 stars

Love Is a Kingdom received generally positive reviews across major publications.

Kyann-Sian Williams of NME praised both the production and the singers vocal ability, writing that "the EP is a masterclass in recalibration: less about applause, more about intention, clarity, and grounding, and a reminder that the most potent love is the one you cultivate first for yourself". Boutayna Chokrane of Pitchfork wrote that compared to the previous album, Born in the Wild, in Love Is a Kingdom Tems "pares everything back", describing it "liturgical" where "songs move like mood swings in slow motion, dwelling on a fragment of time before shifting".

=== Accolades ===
Year	Awards ceremony	Award description(s)	Results	Ref
2026	The Headies	Best R&B Album	Pending	

== Track listing ==
All tracks are written by Temilade Openiyi, except where noted.

Love Is a Kingdom track listing
No.	Title	Writer(s)	Producer(s)	Length
1.	"First"		Tems; GuiltyBeatz	2:56
2.	"I'm Not Sure"		Tems; Jonah Christian; Rob Bisel	2:17
3.	"Big Daddy"		Tems; GuiltyBeatz; AoD	2:46
4.	"Lagos Love"	Temilade Openiyi; Micheal Hunter; Alastair O’Donell	London; AoD	3:10
5.	"Mine"		Tems; GuiltyBeatz	2:40
6.	"What You Need"		Tems; GuiltyBeatz	3:52
7.	"Is There a Reason"		Tems; V-Ron	2:12
Total length:				19:58

== Charts ==
Chart performance for Love Is a Kingdom
Chart (2025–2026)	Peak position
Australian Hip Hop/R&B Albums (ARIA)	20
Portuguese Albums (AFP)	108
UK Album Downloads (Official Charts)	83
US World Albums (Billboard)	2
