= Burning (Tems song) =

Single by Tems

from the album Born in the Wild
- Released: 7 June 2024
- Length: 2:58
- Label: RCA; Since '93
- Songwriter: Temilade Openiyi
- Producers: Tems: GuiltyBeatz

Tems singles chronology
"Love Me JeJe" (2024)	"Burning" (2024)	"Raindance" (2025)

Music video
- "Burning" on YouTube

"Burning" is a song by Nigerian singer Tems, released on 7 June 2024, via RCA Records. The song was written and produced by Tems alongside frequent collaborator GuiltyBeatz, it serves as the third single from her debut studio album, Born in the Wild (2024). "Burning" received a nomination at the 67th Annual Grammy Awards for Best R&B Song.

== Composition ==
Burning sees Tems singing about her feelings and emotion when she first gained fame and recognition. In the song, she also further recounts on her experiences about being taken of and deceitful people in the music industry.

Speaking in an interview with Apple Music 1, Tems highlighted that "Burning" is about the feelings I felt when I first started getting popular as Tems. I didn't really understand what was happening, and everything was happening so fast.". Tems further explained that "We all have the things that we struggle with, our triggers. And 'Burning' is really about understanding that I have my triggers too, and now I know that I'm not alone."

== Music video ==
Tems released the official music video on 5 August 2024. Originally scheduled for an earlier release date, it was pushed back due to a End Bad Governance protest in Nigeria. Directed by Tems, the visuals sees her walking across the streets of New York, taking a train ride at Canal Street station. Moreover, it contains footage of Tems performing during her Born in the Wild Tour in Paris. The video ends with Tems watching clips of herself ranging from music videos to red carpet appearances on New York's Times Square digital billboards highlighting her musical journey so far.

== Live performance ==
Tems performed the song for the first time on her ongoing Born in the Wild Tour and on the American late-night talk show The Late Show with Stephen Colbert in September 2024, her debut appearance on the series.

== Charts ==
Chart performance for "Burning"
Chart (2024)	Peak position
Nigeria (TurnTable Top 100)	72
UK Afrobeats (OCC)	3
US Hot R&B Songs (Billboard)	15
US Adult R&B Songs (Billboard)	8
US R&B/Hip-Hop Airplay (Billboard)	34
US World Digital Song Sales (Billboard)	9
