= What You Need (Tems song) =

Single by Tems

from the EP Love Is a Kingdom
- Released: 21 November 2025
- Length: 3:54
- Label: RCA; Since '93
- Songwriter: Temilade Openiyi
- Producers: Tems; GuiltyBeatz

Tems singles chronology
"Raindance" (2025)	"What You Need" (2025)

Music video
- "What You Need" on YouTube

"What You Need" is a song by Nigerian singer Tems, released on 21 November 2025, via RCA Records. The song was written and produced by Tems alongside frequent collaborator GuiltyBeatz, it serves as a single from her EP, Love Is a Kingdom (2025). Following the release of a Colors performance of the song which was released on 29 January 2026, it debuted on the Billboard Hot 100, earning Tems her seventh entry and her second solo entry. The song was nominated for R&B/Soul Song of The Year at the Soul Train Awards 2026.

“What You Need” received 2 nominations at the 69th Annual Grammy Awards for Best R&B Song and Best R&B Solo Performance.

== Critical reception ==
What You Need received acclaim across major publications, being considered by Boutayna Chokrane of Pitchfork "the EP's turning point". Emmanuel Muna of Premium Times defined the song as "Tems in complete command" in which she "delivers one of her fiercest performances, choosing solitude over an unfulfilling relationship", comparing the production to Timbaland music style. Emmanuel Daraloye of Critical Registrar gave the song a 4 out of 5, noting that "It is of Tems' more emotionally precise moments".

== Commercial performance ==
"What You Need" debuted on the Billboard Hot 100 on week ending 12 February 2026, becoming her seventh entry on the chart and her second solo song. It peaked at number 29, becoming Tems' highest placement on the chart as a solo artist.

== Music video ==
The official music video of the song, directed by Ayinde Anderson, was published on 3 June 2026.

== Charts ==
Weekly chart performance for "What You Need"
Chart (2025–2026)	Peak position
New Zealand Hot Singles (RMNZ)	22
Nigeria (TurnTable Top 100)	78
UK Afrobeats (Official Charts)	2
US Billboard Hot 100	29
US Hot R&B/Hip-Hop Songs (Billboard)	3
US R&B/Hip-Hop Airplay (Billboard)	1
US Rhythmic Airplay (Billboard)	1
