= Murder Dem =

Single by Jesse Jagz
- Released: December 2, 2012
- Recorded: 2012
- Genre: Reggae; hip hop
- Length: 3:26
- Label: Chocolate City
- Songwriter(s): Jesse Abaga
- Producer(s): Jesse Jagz

Jesse Jagz singles chronology
"Murder Dem" (2012)	"Redemption" (2013)

Music video
- "Murder Dem" on YouTube

"Murder Dem" is a song by Nigerian rapper and record producer Jesse Jagz. It was released on December 2, 2012, by Chocolate City. Jesse Jagz's second studio album, Jagz Nation, Vol. 1: Thy Nation Come (2013) was initially supposed to feature the song. However, "Murder Dem" was ultimately removed from the album's final track list due to the rapper's departure from Chocolate City.

== Sample and performance ==
"Murder Dem" samples the church hymn "Joyful, Joyful, We Adore Thee" and was originally sung by Jesse Jagz on the reality TV show Nigerian Idol.

== Music video ==
The music video for "Murder Dem" was directed by MEX Films. It was uploaded to YouTube on February 27, 2013, with a total length of 3 minutes and 47 seconds. In the video, Jesse Jagz plays the general of Jagz Nation, a fictional character who is on Nigeria's most wanted list. Throughout the video, several newspaper headlines hinted at the general's possible assassination and capture. The video features footage of Bob Marley, Fela Kuti, and the Nigerian Army. Moreover, the room that served as its main setting featured wall posters and a television set.

== Critical reception ==
"Murder Dem" received positive reviews from music critics. A writer for the website Nigerian Sounds commended the song for "showcasing Jesse Jagz's avant-garde production style" and praised the rapper's rhyming style.

=== Accolades ===
The music video for "Murder Dem" was nominated for Most Gifted Ragga/Dancehall Video at the 10th Annual Channel O Music Video Awards, which took place at the Walter Sisulu Square in Kliptown, Soweto, on November 30, 2013.
