= Odysseus (album) =

Studio album by Jesse Jagz
- Released: September 8, 2017
- Recorded: 2017
- Genres: Hip hop; dancehall
- Length: 45:00
- Label: Jagz Nation
- Producer: Jesse Jagz

Jesse Jagz chronology
The Indestructible Choc Boi Nation (2015)	Odysseus (2017)

Singles from Odysseus
- 1. "Best in You" Released: 2017

Odysseus is the fourth studio album by Nigerian rapper and record producer Jesse Jagz. It was released by Jagz Nation on September 8, 2017. The album features guest appearances from Hotyce, Styl-Plus, Cynthia Morgan, Melon, and Burna Boy. Prior to releasing the album, Jesse Jagz released a number of singles in 2017, including "Midnight Vibes" and "New World". "Best in You" was released as the album's only single. Odysseus draws influences from Caribbean sounds, supporting the dancehall identity that Jesse Jagz embraced on his second studio album Jagz Nation, Vol. 1: Thy Nation Come (2013).

== Background and artwork ==
Jesse Jagz originally began production on Odysseus in August 2014. The album was initially scheduled for release in 2015, but was delayed multiple times. Its title was inspired by Odysseus, the legendary Greek king of Ithaca. Although built on a predominantly hip-hop foundation, some of the tracks on Odysseus are infused with Caribbean riddim and patois-laced rap. In June 2017, Jesse Jagz unveiled the album's cover art on his Instagram page. It features a picture of his mother, Lydia Abaga, as a child. The cover depicts his mother sitting with clergyman Jan Boer's three biological children. The photo was taken in the grounds of Boer's idyllic Jos home. Jesse Jagz performed tracks from the album to select listeners at an Industry Nite event, which was held on June 28, 2017, at Spice Route in Victoria Island, Lagos.

== Music and composition ==
On the album's opener "Genesis", Jesse Jagz channels Drake and is reminiscent of his life's journey. He can be heard rapping over ambient layers of vocal harmonies. Reviewing for Filter Free Nigeria, Ehis Combs said the song is "repetitive" and has a "one-dimensional rhyme pattern". "Wide and Blue" contains an alternate piano sample of "Murder She Wrote", as performed by Chaka Demus & Pliers. The Hotyce-assisted track "Dirty" is composed of bass, percussions, drums and a trap instrumental. "Best in You" explores themes of romantic declarations, assurance, doubt, and paranoia. The song contains the nursery rhyme "Row, Row, Row Your Boat" and a sample of Lighthouse Family's "Ocean Drive". Oris Aigbokhaevbolo said "Best in You" is "lyrical cohesive" and that its "delivery, slurred and semi-comical, takes some imagination".

The nostalgic track "Alright" features vocals by R&B group Styl-Plus. A writer for YNaija described "Alright" as an oversight from the album and a "cheap attempt at nostalgia, filtered through heavy bass and auto-tune". In "Ghetto Youth", Jesse Jagz tells the story of life as witnessed on the streets. In "Wide And Blue", he comes to terms with his mortality, infusing the song with drug metaphors and pseudo-religious messages. In a mediocre review of "Wide and Blue", Debola Abimbolu of Native magazine said the "disjointed narrative between the verses and the hook makes the lyrics unconvincing and the rhymes lacking of the cumulative effect". The Burna Boy-assisted track "Violation" is a blend of boom bap rap and dancehall. Combs believes the song is "one of the brightest moments on the project".

== Critical reception ==
Professional ratings
Review scores
Source	Rating
Pulse Nigeria	3/5 stars
Filter Free Nigeria	57/100

Odysseus received mixed reviews from critics. In a review for The Native magazine, Debola Abimbolu said Odysseus is not a "genre blending masterpiece worthy of Yeezus status nor hip-hop enough to be Illmatic, yet, its aspiration to somehow draw parallels with such projects is admirable enough to be applauded." Oris Aigbokhaevbolo of Music in Africa said Jesse Jagz did not make a perfect album this time, but acknowledged the first half of Odysseus for being "flawless".

A Pulse Nigeria contributor, who goes by Jonathan, called the album "average" and said it is "not a project that provides enjoyment, neither does it do anything well enough to stand out". Ehis Combs, writing for Filter Free Nigeria, stated: "Whilst not being a bad album in any way, Odysseus sounded like a tired and recycled Jesse Jagz who finally tries to conform to trending sounds." Filter Free Nigeria's Dennis Peter praised the album's production, but ended up saying the "average nature of the project left him with a familiar feeling".

== Track listing ==
No.	Title	Writer(s)	Length
1.	"Genesis"	Jesse Garba Abaga	5:00
2.	"Dirty" (featuring Hotyce)	Abaga; Emeka Ejechi	4:10
3.	"Best in You"	Abaga	4:57
4.	"Alright" (featuring Styl-Plus)	Abaga; Shifi Emoefe; Zeal Onyecheme	4:10
5.	"Wide and Blue"	Abaga	4:31
6.	"Fine n Clean" (featuring Cynthia Morgan)	Abaga; Cynthia Morgan	3:57
7.	"Awake"	Abaga	4:34
8.	"Ghetto Youth" (featuring Melon)	Abaga; Melon	4:42
9.	"Rude Boys Quarters"	Abaga	4:38
10.	"Violation" (featuring Burna Boy)	Abaga; Damini Ogulu	4:56
Total length:			45:00

Notes

- "Best in You" contains the nursery rhyme "Row, Row, Row Your Boat", and samples the chorus of Lighthouse Family's "Ocean Drive".
- "Wide and Blue" contains an alternate piano sample of "Murder She Wrote", as performed by Chaka Demus & Pliers.

== Personnel ==
- Jesse Garba Abaga – executive producer, writer, composer
- Emeka Ejechi – featured artist
- Shifi Emoefe – featured artist
- Zeal Onyecheme – featured artist
- Cynthia Morgan – featured artist
- Melon – featured artist
- Damini Ogulu – featured artist

== Release history ==
Region	Date	Format	Version	Label
Various	September 8, 2017	CD, Digital download	Standard	Jagz Nation
