= Laho (song) =

2025 single by Shallipopi

Single by Shallipopi

from the album Auracle
- Released: 13 March 2025
- Genre: Afrobeats
- Length: 2:24
- Label: Plutomania; Since '93
- Songwriters: Crown Uzama; Dwills Harmony; Eredoro Progress
- Producer: Progrex

Shallipopi singles chronology
"Benin Boys" (2024)	"Laho" (2025)	"Laho II" (2025)

Music video
- "Laho" on YouTube

"Laho" is a song by Nigerian singer and rapper Shallipopi. It was released on 13 March 2025, under Shallipopi's record label, Plutomania Records and the British label Since '93. The song peaked at number 5 on the Billboard U.S. Afrobeats Songs chart.

== Background and controversy ==
In January 2025, Shallipopi previewed the song with a studio session snippet on his official Twitter account. "Laho" was initially released on 21 February 2025. However, it was subsequently removed due to a dispute with his record label. The controversy surrounding the song's release led to a publicized disagreement between Shallipopi and his former label executive. After resolving the issue, Shallipopi re-released the single "Laho" on 13 March 2025, under Plutomania Records and Since '93, in accordance with the agreed-upon distribution arrangement.

== Composition ==
"Laho" loosely translates to "please don’t let me fall" or "don't let me down" in the Edo language. The lyrics celebrate his wealth, fame, and hometown Benin City, with Shallipopi adopting the persona of the "Minister of Enjoyment" to emphasize his luxurious lifestyle.

== Critical reception ==
Rolling Stone included "Laho" in their list of the Best Songs of 2025 So Far, with author Mankaprr Conteh describing it as "the laid-back anthem that's taken over African social media." Conteh further stated that Shallipopi "created another moment with 'Laho'", as he had previously "made a splash" with "Cast" featuring Odumodublvck in 2023, and was "repping for his hometown of Benin City" in "Benin Boys" with Rema in 2024. Nosakhare Akhimien of Premium Times commended Shallipopi for "blending his Benin roots with modern Afrobeats vibes." Akhimien concluded, "With 'Laho', Shallipopi strengthens his grip on Nigerian street pop," adding that "the song's Edo roots, money struggles, and hypnotic beat make it stand out." Peace Umanah of TooXclusive praised Shallipopi's "ability to blend street lingo with catchy hooks," making the song "an instant club and street anthem." She concluded that the song showed growth and momentum, calling it "a testament to Shallipopi’s unstoppable rise in the Nigerian music scene."

== Music video ==
The music video for the song was released on 14 March 2025, and was directed by Perliks Definition. The video features cameo appearances by Shallipopi's brothers Zerrydl and Famous Pluto.

== Remix with Burna Boy ==
"Laho II"

Remix by Shallipopi featuring Burna Boy
- Released: 25 April 2025
- Recorded: 2025
- Genre: Afrobeats
- Length: 2:37
- Label: Since '93; Plutomania
- Songwriters: Crown Uzama; Damini Ogulu; Dwills Harmony
- Producer: Progrex

Burna Boy chronology
"4 Kampé II" (2025)	"Laho II" (2025)	"TaTaTa" (2025)

Music video
- "Laho II" on YouTube

On 25 April 2025, a remix of the song, featuring Nigerian singer and songwriter Burna Boy, titled "Laho II", was released.

== Accolades ==
Year	Awards ceremony	Award description(s)	Results
2026	All Africa Music Awards	Song of the Year	Won
2026	All Africa Music Awards	Best African Collaboration	Won
2026	Ghana Music Awards	African Song of the Year	Nominated

== Charts ==
Chart performance for "Laho"
Chart (2025)	Peak position
Nigeria (TurnTable)	4
UK Singles (Official Charts)	57
UK Afrobeats (Official Charts)	2
UK Hip Hop/R&B (Official Charts)	12
US Afrobeats Songs (Billboard)	9

== Release history ==
Release dates and formats for "Laho"
Region	Date	Format	Label	Ref.
Various	13 March 2025	Digital download; Streaming	Plutomania; Since '93	

Release dates and formats for "Laho II"
Region	Date	Format	Label	Ref.
Various	25 April 2025	Digital download; Streaming	Since '93; Plutomania	

== Certification ==
Certifications for "Laho"
Region	Certification	Certified units/sales
United Kingdom (BPI)	Silver	200,000^{‡}
Nigeria (TCSN)	4× Platinum	400,000^{‡}
^{‡} Sales+streaming figures based on certification alone.
