= Back to Back (Zerrydl song) =

2024 single by Zerrydl

Single by Zerrydl
- Released: September 13, 2024
- Recorded: 2024
- Length: 2:26
- Label: Plutomania; Dapper
- Songwriter: Divine Uzama
- Producer: Busy Pluto

Zerrydl singles chronology
"O.U.A.T" (2024)	"Back to Back" (2024)	"Hausapiano (Remix)" (2024)

Music video
- "Back to Back" on YouTube

"Back to Back" is a song by Nigerian singer, rapper, and songwriter Zerrydl, released through Plutomania Records, and Dapper Music on September 13, 2024, as a single. In the United States, the song debuted at number 42 on the Billboard Afrobeats Songs chart.

== Charts ==
Chart performance for "Back to Back"
Chart (2024)	Peak position
Nigeria (TurnTable Top 100)	21
US Afrobeats Songs (Billboard)	42
UK Afrobeats (Official Charts)	16
Top Street-POP Songs (TurnTable)	3
Official Streaming Songs (TurnTable)	10
