= Shakespopi =

2024 studio album by Shallipopi

Studio album by Shallipopi
- Released: April 11, 2024
- Genre: Afrobeats
- Length: 24:00
- Label: Plutomania Records; Dapper Music & Ent
- Producer: X; Signal; Larry Lanes; P2J; P.Priime

Shallipopi chronology
Presido La Pluto (2023)	Shakespopi (2024)

Shakespopi (ˌʃeɪksˈpɒpi) (stylized in all caps) is the second studio album by Nigerian singer Shallipopi. It was released through Plutomania Records and Dapper Music & Ent on April 11, 2024. It serves as the follow-up to his previous album, Presido La Pluto (2023).

== Background and release ==
Shallipopi first announced the album in late March 2024. On April 10, 2024, he posted a promotional video on Instagram, confirming the album's release. The next day, April 11, the album was officially released via his label, Plutomania Records.

== Reception ==
Professional ratings
Review scores
Source	Rating
Pulse Nigeria	4.2/10
The Upperent	3.2/5 stars
Premium Times	5/10
The Native	8.2/10

Shakespopi received mixed reviews. According to Adeayo Adebiyo of Pulse Nigeria, the album features some of Shallipopi's weakest hooks and overly short songs, with rhymes that are "comically juvenile" and excessive use of street language. In contrast, Wale Oloworekende of The NATIVE wrote that Shakespopi is a successful "heat check" with an audience eager for more, praising the album's promotion of Benin culture and street language in its lyrics.

== Commercial performance ==
Shakespopi debuted at number one on the Nigeria Apple Music chart in its first week, becoming Shallipopi's highest-charting album at the time. Additionally, it outsold other notable releases that week, including Portable's "Tony Montana", which featured rapper Skepta. Furthermore, the album's lead single, "ASAP", debuted at number one on the Nigeria Apple Music Top 100 chart.

== Track listing ==
Credits adapted from Spotify.

Shakespopi
No.	Title	Writer(s)	Producer(s)	Length
1.	"ASAP"	Crown Uzama	Signal the Plug; Producer X	2:40
2.	"High Tension"	Crown Uzama	Producer X	3:00
3.	"100"	Crown Uzama	Signal the Plug	2:52
4.	"Dey"	Crown Uzama	Producer X	2:55
5.	"Billion" (featuring: Jeneral; Reehaa; Tegaboi DC; Zerrydl)	Crown Uzama	Signal the Plug	4:34
6.	"Find Me"	Crown Uzama	Larry Lanes	2:26
7.	"New Cat"	Crown Uzama	Producer X	2:02
8.	"Start Am"	Crown Uzama	Larry Lanes	2:54
9.	"Trees"	Crown Uzama	Larry Lanes	2:18
Total length:				24:00

== Personnel ==
Credits adapted from Spotify.

Performers

- Shallipopi – primary artist, lead vocals (all tracks)
- Zerrydl – featured artist (track 5)
- Jeneral – featured artist (track 5)
- Reehaa – featured artist (track 5)
- Tegaboi DC – featured artist (track 5)

Production

- Producer X – producer (tracks 1, 2, 4, 7)
- Signal the Plug – producer (tracks 1, 3, 5)
- Larry Lanes – producer (tracks 6, 8, 9)

== Charts ==
Chart performance for Shakespopi
Chart (2024)	Peak position
Nigerian Albums (TurnTable Top 100 Albums)	1
