= Jagz Nation, Vol. 2: Royal Niger Company =

Studio album by Jesse Jagz
- Released: March 28, 2014
- Recorded: 2013–2014
- Genre: Hip hop
- Length: 65:00
- Label: Jagz Nation
- Producers: Jesse Jagz; Shady Bizniz; Dugod; Ibro; Phazehop

Jesse Jagz chronology
Jagz Nation, Vol. 1: Thy Nation Come (2013)	Jagz Nation, Vol. 2: Royal Niger Company (2014)	The Indestructible Choc Boi Nation (2015)

Singles from Jagz Nation, Vol. 2: Royal Niger Company
- 1. "The Search (Radio)" Released: May 15, 2014; 2. "Sunshine" Released: March 17, 2015

Jagz Nation, Vol. 2: Royal Niger Company is the third studio album by Nigerian rapper and record producer Jesse Jagz. Released by Jagz Nation on March 28, 2014, the album marked a departure from the dancehall and ragga elements deployed on Jagz Nation, Vol. 1: Thy Nation Come (2013). Jesse Jagz enlisted Shady, Dugod, Ibro and Phazehop to assist with production. The album consists of samples ranging from Rufus & Chaka Khan's "Ain't Nobody" to excerpts from movies such as Network (1976), Scarface (1983) and Johnny Mad Dog (2008).

Jagz Nation, Vol. 2: Royal Niger Company features guest appearances and recording samples from Fela Kuti, Tupac, Rufus & Chaka Khan, Tesh Carter, Jumar, Dugod, Sarah Mitaru, Rexx and Show Dem Camp. The album yielded the singles "The Search (Radio)" and "Sunshine".

== Background and promotion ==
Jesse Jagz started creating the album by recording a mixture of ideas for two months. After the two-month period, his team sifted through the music and selected the album's final track list. He chose the album's title to sensitize Nigerians about their history and said he made the album for his core fans. He describes the album as two steps above Jagz Nation, Vol. 1: Thy Nation Come, and said he wanted to stay away from reggae influential sounds for sentimental reasons. He hopes people find healing from the album and wants people who are hurting to find comfort in it.

On March 17, 2014, the album's cover art was released to the general public. It is inspired by René Magritte and is symbolic of a man standing with a fruit and apple blocking his face. The concept behind Magritte's work revolves around revealing one thing and hiding another. The cover art features a model holding different things that symbolize the culture of Nigeria. Jagz Nation, Vol. 2: Royal Niger Company was initially meant to be a mixtape and was initially titled The Transfiguration of Jesse Jagz. On March 28, 2014, Jesse Jagz made the album available for digital streaming on SoundCloud. On August 2, 2014, he held the second edition of the Jesse Jagz Experience concert at the AGIP Recital Hall; he called it "The Greatest Concert" and performed with a 16-man hip-hop orchestra band.

The album's lead single, "The Search (Radio)", was released on May 15, 2014. It includes rap verses by Jumar and Dugod. The song's accompanying music video was directed by J.O King. The music video for "Sunshine", the album's second single, was directed by Terver Trump and released on March 17, 2015.

== Composition ==
Jagz Nation, Vol. 2: Royal Niger Company is an all-out rap album that doesn't favor any mainstream commercial appeal. On the Joe Louis-inspired album's opener "Louis", Jesse Jagz raps about one finding their inner strength; the song is a mixture of rap and Rastafarian styles. In "Jargo (Ain't Nobody)", he samples Rufus & Chaka Khan's "Ain't Nobody" and raps about the dynamics of a complex relationship. "Sunshine" contains a popular riff by Fela Kuti and incorporates "Loopy Bars", a J-Town style of rap. In "The Search (Radio)", he blends hip hop and jazz sounds together. "Supply and Demand" is a throwback song with a New York pounding flow that is reminiscent of 1995 and the East Coast circa. In "Sunrise (Shine On)", Jesse Jagz samples a dialogue from the 1983 crime drama film Scarface. The album's closing track, "How We Do", contains spoken words by American rapper Tupac and is driven by a menacing beat.

== Critical reception ==
Professional ratings
Review scores
Source	Rating
Nigerian Entertainment Today	4/5 stars
Lobatan	4/5 stars

Jagz Nation, Vol. 2: Royal Niger Company received positive reviews from music critics. Ayomide Tayo of Nigerian Entertainment Today awarded the album 4 stars out of 5, saying it was made for rap fans to "chill and relax to" and acknowledged it for not seeking the approval of radio or Alaba. Wilfred Okiche praised the album's cohesiveness and said it "deserves to be saved in a time capsule, to be brought up years later when someone tries to suggest great records weren’t made in 2014". Okiche also called it "ambitious, daring, cerebral and painfully beautiful".

Lobatan's Brandon Bridges granted the album 4 stars out of 5, saying it "plays by no rules and subjects to no compromise" while also noting its themes are not "a newly applied road of thought". In a review for Filter Free Nigeria, Dennis Peter commended the album's production and Jesse Jagz's rhymes and metaphors. Peters also considers the album to be Jesse Jagz's best album yet.

== Track listing ==
No.	Title	Writer(s)	Length
1.	"Louis"	Jesse Garba Abaga	6:44
2.	"Jargo (Ain't Nobody)" (featuring Tesh Carter and Chaka Khan)	Abaga; Tesh Carter	4:27
3.	"Oceans and Lakes" (featuring Sarah Mitaru and Dugod)	Abaga; Sarah Mitaru; Chidozie Ezeogu	4:43
4.	"Sunshine" (featuring Fela Kuti)	Abaga	5:44
5.	"The Search (Radio)" (featuring Jumar and Dugod)	Abaga; Chidozie Ezeogu; Jumar	5:20
6.	"Supply and Demand"	Abaga	6:35
7.	"High-Life" (featuring Rexx)	Abaga; Rexx	7:00
8.	"Sunrise (Shine On)"	Abaga	6:43
9.	"The Case" (featuring Show Dem Camp)	Abaga; Show Dem Camp	6:01
10.	"The Window" (featuring Jumar)	Abaga; Jumar	5:07
11.	"How We Do" (featuring Tupac)	Abaga	5:46

Samples

- "Louis" samples a rant by Howard Beale, a fictional character from the movie Network
- "Jargo (Ain't Nobody)" samples "Ain't Nobody", as performed by Rufus and Chaka Khan; it also samples excerpts from the film Johnny Mad Dog (2008)
- "Sunshine" contains a popular riff by Fela Kuti
- "How We Do" samples spoken words by Tupac Shakur
- "Sunrise (Shine On)" samples a dialogue from the film Scarface (1983)

== Personnel ==
- Jesse Garba Abaga – executive producer, writer, composer
- Shadrach "Shady Bizniz" Ishaya – producer
- Chidozie "Dugod" Ezeogu – producer, featured artist
- Tesh Carter – featured artist
- Sarah Mitaru – featured artist
- Jumar – featured artist
- Rex – featured artist
- Show Dem Camp – featured artists
- Ibrahim "Ibro" Pashi – producer, mixing, mastering
- Bolaji "Phazehop" Williams – producer, mixing, mastering
- J Barz – producer
- Wilfred Crackaz Peter – bass guitar, live instruments
- Progress Hopeman – live instruments
- Adu Edu Bassey – live instruments
- House of Zoe Africa – management, visual production, cover art
- Ogbannaya "Signor Chuksy" Chukwudi – art director, graphic design, photography
- iola Creative – styling
- Damimola Alabi – cover art model

== Release history ==
Digital platform	Date	Version	Format	Label
SoundCloud	March 28, 2014	Standard	Digital download	Jagz Nation
