= ASAP (Shallipopi song) =

2024 single by Shallipopi

Song by Shallipopi

from the album Shakespopi
- Released: April 11, 2024
- Recorded: 2024
- Genre: Afrobeat
- Length: 2:40
- Label: Plutomania; Dapper Music
- Songwriter: Crown Uzama
- Producers: Producer X; Signal the Plug

Shallipopi singles chronology
"Iyo" (2023)	"ASAP" (2024)

Music video
- "ASAP" on YouTube

"ASAP" is a song by Nigerian singer Shallipopi, released by Plutomania Records and Dapper Music on April 11, 2024, as the lead single from his second studio album, Shakespopi (2024). The song was produced by Producer X and Signal the Plug.

== Music video ==
The music video for 'ASAP' was released on YouTube on April 13, 2024, and was directed by Wowa.

== Charts ==
Chart (2024)	Peak position
Nigeria (TurnTable Top 100)	1
UK (Afrobeat Top 100)	2
Official Streaming Songs (TurnTable)	1
Official Radio Songs (TurnTable)	27

== Certifications ==
Certifications for "ASAP"
Region	Certification	Certified units/sales
Nigeria (TCSN)	Platinum	100,000^{‡}
^{‡} Sales+streaming figures based on certification alone.
