= Redemption (Jesse Jagz song) =

Single by Jesse Jagz

from the album Jagz Nation, Vol. 1: Thy Nation Come
- Released: May 29, 2013
- Recorded: 2013
- Genre: Reggae; dancehall; hip-hop
- Length: 4:25
- Label: Jagz Nation
- Songwriter: Jesse Abaga
- Producer: Jesse Jagz

Jesse Jagz singles chronology
"Murder Dem" (2012)	"Redemption" (2013)	"3rd World War" (2013)

Music video
- "Redemption" on YouTube

"Redemption" is a song by Nigerian rapper and record producer Jesse Jagz. It was released as the lead single from his second studio album, Jagz Nation, Vol. 1: Thy Nation Come (2013). The song is the first single that Jesse Jagz put out after leaving Chocolate City.

== Music video ==
MEX films filmed the music video for "Redemption" at Samklef's Lagos studio. The video was uploaded to YouTube on May 29, 2013, at a total length of 4 minutes and 24 seconds.

A still image depicting the celebration of Nigeria's annual Democracy Day.

== Critical reception ==
"Redemption" received positive reviews from music critics. Ovie O of NotJustOk commended Jesse Jagz for "delivering conscious dancehall music" and said the rapper was inspired by other Jamaican acts. OkayAfrica said the song is "anchored on an addictive clink-clank beat and swerving synth melody, which Jesse Jagz expertly rides and molds into a hip-hop-meets-dancehall gem." Alex Amos of Onobello considers Jesse Jagz to be "the truth" and said the record "expresses his confidence in the path that he has chosen." Pulse Nigeria's Joey Akan commended Jesse Jagz's rastafarian delivery and said he started his imprint in style.

== Track listing ==
Digital single

No.	Title	Writer(s)	Producer(s)	Length
1.	"Redemption"	Jesse Abaga	Jesse Jagz	4:25

== Release history ==
Region	Date	Format	Label
Nigeria	May 29, 2013	CD, Digital download	Jagz Nation
