= Westside Connection (song) =

2025 single by Rod Wave

Single by Rod Wave
- Released: January 10, 2025
- Genre: Trap
- Length: 2:44
- Label: Alamo; Sony Music
- Songwriters: Rodarius Green; Tarkan Kozluklu; Darius Poviliūnas; Benjamin Hubble
- Producers: T5; Wonderyo; Lay-Z; Fielry

Rod Wave singles chronology
"Fall Fast in Love" (2024)	"Westside Connection" (2025)	"Sinners" (2025)

Music video
- "Westside Connection" on YouTube

"Westside Connection" is a single by American rapper Rod Wave, released on January 10, 2025. It was produced by T5, Wonderyo, Lay-Z and Fielry.

== Composition and lyrics ==
"Westside Connection" is a melodic trap song with piano keys and 808 drums. Lyrically, Rod Wave reflects on a difficult and confusing relationship with a lover that is causing him heartache and sorrow. He sings about persevering while critically addressing her disloyalty ("I don't get it, let's switch this chapter, I don't like the story, I'm changin' it / Just met a uphill battle, it's okay I was made for this / And you were never there for me, I tried to give you everything / You can't get away with this / We was in the bottom together, you're supposed to be right here with me / Hate me for what I did to you, I'on hate you for what you did to me"). At the same time, he acknowledges her helping him during a time when he was suffering.

== Critical reception ==
Zachary Horvath of HotNewHipHop wrote, "Selling this entire complicated love story is Rod's terrific and passionate vocals and melodies. He's always able to sound so delicate yet powerful, and this track could be a sign of more great music to come in 2025." Preezy Brown of Vibe, who called the song a "lovelorn salvo", remarked that "Rod Wave has all but mastered the composition of emotive serenades, as he rarely misses when sticking to his tried-and-true script."

== Charts ==
Chart performance for "Westside Connection"
Chart (2025)	Peak position
New Zealand Hot Singles (RMNZ)	36
US Bubbling Under Hot 100 (Billboard)	6
US Hot R&B/Hip-Hop Songs (Billboard)	31
