= Fall Fast in Love =

2024 single by Rod Wave

Single by Rod Wave

from the album Last Lap
- Released: September 27, 2024
- Length: 2:52
- Label: Alamo
- Songwriters: Rodarius Green; Christopher Fizer; Niko Schneider; Felix Govaerts; Tarkan Kozluklu
- Producers: Chris Made; FlexOnDaTrack; Neeko Baby; T Five

Rod Wave singles chronology
"Passport Junkie" (2024)	"Fall Fast in Love" (2024)	"Westside Connection" (2025)

Music video
- "Fall Fast in Love" on YouTube

"Fall Fast in Love" is a song by American rapper and singer Rod Wave, released on September 27, 2024, through Alamo Records as the second single from his sixth studio album, Last Lap. It was written alongside producers Chris Made, FlexOnDaTrack, Neeko Baby, and T Five.

== Background ==
"Fall Fast in Love" was initially previewed by Green himself through his Instagram story in June 2024. On September 26, Green officially announced the release of Last Lap while the premiere of the track's music video confirmed its release for the following day. On the night of the track's release, Green announced the track through his Instagram.

== Content ==
The song finds Green "exploring how falling for a romantic interest very quickly can be a dangerous proposition in life" while also suggesting that "he's willing to roll the dice". It sees Green "lamenting over a failed relationship" while he sings about his "shortcomings as a potential partner", particularly "that he grows attached too quickly".

== Critical reception ==
Billboard's Michael Saponara described the song as "sultry". Devin Morton of HotNewHipHop wrote that on the song, Green is "searching for approval from the girl he's singing about".

== Music video ==
The Mali-directed music video premiered alongside the single. The music video "delves into the puppy-love stages of a relationship in elementary school and grows into adulthood when the couple deals with life’s hurdles".

== Charts ==
Chart performance for "Fall Fast in Love"
Chart (2024)	Peak position
New Zealand Hot Singles (RMNZ)	36
US Billboard Hot 100	49
US Hot R&B/Hip-Hop Songs (Billboard)	13

== Certifications ==
Region	Certification	Certified units/sales
United States (RIAA)	Platinum	1,000,000^{‡}
^{‡} Sales+streaming figures based on certification alone.
