= Me & U (Tems song) =

Single by Tems

from the album Born in the Wild
- Released: 5 October 2023
- Recorded: 2021
- Genre: Afrobeats
- Length: 3:13
- Label: RCA; Since '93
- Songwriters: Temilade Openiyi; Ronald Banful
- Producer: GuiltyBeatz

Tems singles chronology
"Free Mind" (2022)	"Me & U" (2023)	"Not an Angel" (2023)

Music video
- "Me & U" on YouTube

"Me & U" is a song by Nigerian singer and songwriter Tems, released on 5 October 2023, through RCA Records. Written and produced by both GuiltyBeatz and Tems, it serves as the lead single for her debut album Born in the Wild, and is her first solo release since her extended play If Orange Was a Place (2021).

"Me & U" received an award for Outstanding International Song at the 55th NAACP Image Awards and BET Award for Dr. Bobby Jones Best Gospel/Inspirational Award.

== Background ==
In 2021, Tems released her second EP If Orange Was a Place. In 2022, Her song "Free Mind" from her debut EP For Broken Ears impacted Rhythmic contemporary radio as a single and charted across the United States. She also achieved success with her collaborations with Future's "Wait for U", Beyoncé's "Move" and Rihanna as a songwriter on "Lift Me Up".

Originally recorded in 2021, "Me & U" interpolates Tems's unreleased song "Only Me" featuring Canadian rapper Drake, which was leaked online earlier in 2023. The song marks Tems's first solo output since If Orange Was a Place, excluding her cover of Bob Marley's "No Woman, No Cry" for the Black Panther: Wakanda Forever soundtrack which was released in 2022.

Tems released the song on 5 October 2023 alongside an accompanying music video directed by Tems and shot in Malta.

== Composition ==
According to Billboard "Me & U" is a fusion of "pop ballad and a clubby Afrobeats banger." The song arose from a freestyle Tems recorded shortly after shooting the music video for "Essence" in 2021. After a promotional image was compared to an illustration of Yoruba goddess Yemoja, Tems noted that it's art symbolises Jesus teaching her to walk on water.

Speaking In a press release, Tems spoke about the meaning, saying: "'Me & U' is about discovering the real me, building a genuine relationship with the Creator, and gaining a true perception of self."

== Critical reception ==
"Me & U" received positive critical reception. Consequence noted that it "proves Tems can hold it down on her own, existing somewhere between a traditional pop ballad and a clubby Afrobeats banger.

Billboard wrote that it is a "self-reflection observed through her relationship with God." Shawn Grant writing for The Source states that "with "Me & U" Tems continues to leave her mark on the global music scene, demonstrating her multifaceted talents as both an artist and visionary".

== Commercial performance ==
"Me & U" charted across the United States peaking at No. 10 on the Billboard Bubbling Under Hot 100 Singles, No. 5 on the World Digital Song Sales, No. 12 on the US Hot R&B Songs chart and in the United Kingdom peaked at No. 34 on the Official Singles Chart and reached No. 1 on UK Afrobeats Singles Chart. It also peaked at No. 22 on the New Zealand Hot Singles chart.

== Year-end lists ==
Select year-end rankings of "Me & U"
Publication	List	Rank	Ref.
Billboard	The 100 Best Songs of 2023	52	
Los Angeles Times	The 100 best songs of 2023	18	
Rolling Stone	The 100 Best Songs of 2023	79	
Rolling Stone	The 40 Best Afropop Songs of 2023	25	

== Credits and personnel ==
- Tems – vocals, songwriting
- GuiltyBeatz – songwriting, production
- Chris Gehringer – mixing, engineering
- Ikon – mixing, engineering
- Spax – mixing, engineering

== Charts ==
Chart performance for "Me & U"
Chart (2023)	Peak position
New Zealand Hot Singles (RMNZ)	22
Nigeria (TurnTable Top 100)	8
UK Singles (Official Charts)	34
UK Afrobeats (Official Charts)	1
UK Hip Hop/R&B (Official Charts)	12
US Bubbling Under Hot 100 (Billboard)	10
US Afrobeats Songs (Billboard)	3
US R&B/Hip-Hop Airplay (Billboard)	25
US World Digital Song Sales (Billboard)	5

Chart (2026)	Peak position
Australia Hip Hop/R&B (ARIA)	23
Netherlands (Single Tip)	7
Portugal (AFP)	102

== Certifications ==
Certifications for "Me & U"
Region	Certification	Certified units/sales
Canada (Music Canada)	Gold	40,000^{‡}
France (SNEP)	Gold	100,000^{‡}
New Zealand (RMNZ)	Platinum	30,000^{‡}
Nigeria (TCSN)	Platinum	100,000^{‡}
Portugal (AFP)	Platinum	25,000^{‡}
South Africa (RISA)	Gold	20,000^{‡}
Switzerland (IFPI Switzerland)	Gold	15,000^{‡}
United Kingdom (BPI)	Platinum	600,000^{‡}
United States (RIAA)	Gold	500,000^{‡}
^{‡} Sales+streaming figures based on certification alone.

== Release history ==
Release history and formats for "Me & U"
Region	Date	Format	Label
Various	5 October 2023	Digital download; streaming	RCA; Since '93
