= Raindance (song) =

Single by Dave and Tems

from the album The Boy Who Played the Harp
- Released: 23 October 2025
- Genre: Afroswing
- Length: 3:39
- Label: Neighborhood
- Songwriters: David Oromegie; Temilade Openiyi
- Producers: Jo Caleb; Jonny Leslie; Kyle Evans; Jim Legxacy; Santan; Tems

Dave singles chronology
"Stop Giving Me Advice" (2023)	"Raindance" (2025)

Tems singles chronology
"Burning" (2024)	"Raindance" (2025)	"What You Need" (2025)

Music video
- "Raindance" on YouTube

"Raindance" is a song by British rapper Dave and Nigerian singer Tems. It was released on 23 October 2025 through Neighbourhood Recordings as the fifth track from Dave's third studio album, The Boy Who Played the Harp. The song was written by Dave and Tems who also served as additional producers alongside Jo Caleb, Johnny Lesile, Kyle Evans and Jim Legxacy.

Subsequent to its commercial success, "Raindance" was sent to radio as the only single from The Boy Who Played the Harp. The song gained traction and became a viral hit between the end of 2025 and early 2026, peaking within the top 10 in several countries including Australia, Austria, Germany, Greece, Ireland, the Netherlands, New Zealand, Portugal, Sweden, and Switzerland. "Raindance" peaked at the top of the UK Singles Chart in January 2026, becoming Dave's fourth number-one single and Tems' first. The song was also sent to Italian radio stations as a single on 16 January 2026 through EMI Records.

== Critical reception ==
Writing for Clash, Robin Murray wrote that Tems adds "beauty" to the song and that her vocals "are the perfect counter weight to Dave's own" while noting that "movement between masculine and feminine is something the record explores in-depth". NME's Kyann-Sian Williams compared the song to "No Weapons" (off the same album), stating that the two are "slick and upbeat, but only offer a small moment of levity through a restrained groove rather than any seminal erupting moments". Lawrence Burneyfor Pitchfork described the record as "a sweet, stripped-down take on an Afroswing love song".

== Commercial performance ==
In the United Kingdom, "Raindance" debuted at number five on the UK Singles Chart, moving 34,935 single units in its first week. After cruising in the top 15 of the charts for eight weeks and falling to number 27 during the rise in Christmas songs in late December, during the chart week ending 29 January 2026, "Raindance" rose to number-one in the UK Singles Chart. The song peaked with 50,474 units, consisting of 318 digital downloads and 50,156 sales-equivalent streams.

== Music video ==
Dave released the Nathan James Tettey-directed and Martha Nakintu-produced music video on 9 January 2026. Filmed in Lagos, Nigeria, critics, feeding into dating rumours between the two artists, have stated that the music video "might as well be leaked wedding video footage", continuing that the video depicts the two artists as a "contented, committed couple who only have eyes for each other". The video shows scenes of what looks like a wedding reception with occasional shots of Dave and Tems singing together in different locations, including a beach.

== Charts ==
=== Weekly charts ===
Weekly chart performance
Chart (2025–2026)	Peak position
Australia (ARIA)	8
Australia Hip Hop/R&B (ARIA)	1
Austria (Ö3 Austria Top 40)	7
Belgium (Ultratop 50 Flanders)	29
Belgium (Ultratop 50 Wallonia)	19
Brazil Airplay (Top 100 Brasil)	89
Canada Hot 100 (Billboard)	25
Central America Anglo Airplay (Monitor Latino)	13
CIS Airplay (TopHit)	8
Costa Rica Anglo Airplay (Monitor Latino)	9
Croatia International Airplay (Top lista)	78
Czech Republic Singles Digital (ČNS IFPI)	8
Denmark (Tracklisten)	5
Estonia Airplay (TopHit)	80
Finland (Suomen virallinen lista)	30
France (SNEP)	19
Germany (GfK)	7
Global 200 (Billboard)	12
Greece International (IFPI)	1
Guatemala Anglo Airplay (Monitor Latino)	16
Hungary (Single Top 40)	25
Iceland (Billboard)	15
India International (IMI)	2
Ireland (IRMA)	6
Israel (Mako Hitlist)	27
Italy (FIMI)	40
Italy Airplay (EarOne)	27
Kazakhstan Airplay (TopHit)	12
Latvia Streaming (LaIPA)	5
Lebanon (Lebanese Top 20)	3
Lithuania (AGATA)	2
Luxembourg (Billboard)	1
Malaysia (Billboard)	14
Malaysia International (RIM)	12
Middle East and North Africa (IFPI)	1
Moldova Airplay (TopHit)	69
Netherlands (Dutch Top 40)	7
Netherlands (Single Top 100)	5
New Zealand (Recorded Music NZ)	5
Nigeria (TurnTable Top 100)	7
North Africa (IFPI)	1
Norway (IFPI Norge)	12
Panama Streaming (PRODUCE)	53
Philippines (Philippines Hot 100)	53
Poland (Polish Airplay Top 100)	64
Poland (Polish Streaming Top 100)	65
Portugal (AFP)	4
Romania (Billboard)	14
Romania Airplay (Media Forest)	13
Russia Airplay (TopHit)	8
Saudi Arabia (IFPI)	1
Singapore (RIAS)	17
Slovakia Singles Digital (ČNS IFPI)	6
South Africa Airplay (TOSAC)	6
South Africa Streaming (TOSAC)	4
Suriname (Nationale Top 40)	29
Sweden (Sverigetopplistan)	4
Switzerland (Schweizer Hitparade)	2
Turkey International Airplay (Radiomonitor Türkiye)	7
United Arab Emirates (IFPI)	1
UK Singles (Official Charts)	1
UK Hip Hop/R&B (Official Charts)	1
US Billboard Hot 100	42
US Hot R&B/Hip-Hop Songs (Billboard)	11
US Rhythmic Airplay (Billboard)	8
Venezuela Anglo Airplay (Monitor Latino)	12

=== Monthly charts ===
Monthly chart performance
Chart (2025–2026)	Peak position
CIS Airplay (TopHit)	10
Estonia Airplay (TopHit)	98
Kazakhstan Airplay (TopHit)	17
Lithuania Airplay (TopHit)	28
Moldova Airplay (TopHit)	95
Panama Streaming (PRODUCE)	56
Romania Airplay (TopHit)	24
Russia Airplay (TopHit)	11

== Certifications ==
Certifications for "Raindance"
Region	Certification	Certified units/sales
Australia (ARIA)	Platinum	70,000^{‡}
Belgium (BRMA)	Platinum	40,000^{‡}
Brazil (Pro-Música Brasil)	2× Platinum	80,000^{‡}
Canada (Music Canada)	Platinum	80,000^{‡}
Denmark (IFPI Danmark)	Platinum	90,000^{‡}
France (SNEP)	Platinum	200,000^{‡}
Germany (BVMI)	Gold	300,000^{‡}
Italy (FIMI)	Gold	100,000^{‡}
Netherlands (NVPI)	Platinum	93,000^{‡}
New Zealand (RMNZ)	2× Platinum	60,000^{‡}
Nigeria (TCSN)	Gold	50,000^{‡}
Poland (ZPAV)	Gold	62,500^{‡}
Portugal (AFP)	3× Platinum	75,000^{‡}
South Africa (RISA)	Platinum	40,000^{‡}
Spain (Promusicae)	Gold	50,000^{‡}
United Kingdom (BPI)	2× Platinum	1,200,000^{‡}
Streaming
Czech Republic (ČNS IFPI)	Gold	2,500,000^{†}
Greece (IFPI Greece)	2× Platinum	4,000,000^{†}
Slovakia (ČNS IFPI)	Platinum	1,700,000^{†}
^{‡} Sales+streaming figures based on certification alone.^{†} Streaming-only figures based on certification alone.

== Release history ==
"Raindance" release history
Region	Date	Format	Label	Ref.
Various	23 October 2025	Digital download; streaming; radio airplay	Neighbourhood	
Italy	16 January 2026	Radio airplay	EMI	
United States	3 March 2026	Rhythmic contemporary radio	Interscope	
