= Passport Junkie =

2024 single by Rod Wave

Single by Rod Wave

from the album Last Lap
- Released: September 14, 2024
- Length: 2:27
- Label: Alamo
- Songwriters: Rodarius Green; Kirill Vyacheslavovich; Darius Poviliunas
- Producers: Exuising; T Five; Wonderyo

Rod Wave singles chronology
| "Numb" (2024) | "Passport Junkie" (2024) | "Fall Fast in Love" (2024) |

Music video
- "Passport Junkie" on YouTube

"Passport Junkie" is a song by American rapper and singer Rod Wave, released on September 14, 2024, through Alamo Records as the lead single from his sixth studio album, Last Lap. It was written alongside producers Exuising, T Five, and Wonderyo. The song's title refers to a woman addicted to traveling and leaving the country, hence her being described as a "passport junkie". The track peaked at number 51 on the Billboard Hot 100 and 14 on the Billboard Hot R&B/Hip-Hop Songs chart.

== Background ==
The track was first previewed by Rod Wave in May 2024 through Triller. Leading up to the announcement of the album, on September 4, 2024, Wave announced the Last Lap Tour in support of the album of the same name. Just a day prior to the release of the single, Rod Wave announced its release on his Instagram.

== Content ==
On the track, Rod Wave reflects on the dynamic of his relationship with his partner changing over time. He expresses how before his fame, his partner would be happy with trips to Miami, Florida, however, now, she expects trips to The Bahamas and to the Turks and Caicos Islands.

== Critical reception ==
"Passport Junkie" is described as a "soulful and introspective teaser" to Wave's album, Last Lap. Stupid Dope's Jesse James wrote that Wave "[weaves] his signature mix of vulnerability and raw storytelling into the track".

== Music video ==
An official music video premiered alongside the single. Directed by Cam Blumberg (Cam Videos), the music video sees Rod Wave on a beach enjoying his life on vacation. The video also stars American comedian and actor Druski.

== Charts ==
Chart performance for "Passport Junkie"
| Chart (2024) | Peak position |
|---|---|
| New Zealand Hot Singles (RMNZ) | 33 |
| US Billboard Hot 100 | 51 |
| US Hot R&B/Hip-Hop Songs (Billboard) | 14 |

== Certifications ==
| Region | Certification | Certified units/sales |
|---|---|---|
| United States (RIAA) | Platinum | 1,000,000^{‡} |
^{‡} Sales+streaming figures based on certification alone.
