= Love Me Jeje =

1997 song by Seyi Sodimu

Song by Seyi Sodimu featuring Shafy Bello

from the album Born in Africa
- Language: English
- Released: 1997
- Genre: Nigerian hip hop; Afro-soul
- Songwriter(s): Seyi Sodimu; Shafy Bello

"Love Me Jeje" is a Nigerian hip hop song by U.S-based Nigerian recording artist Seyi Sodimu. Released in 1997 off his studio album titled Born in Africa, "Love Me Jeje" features Afro-soul vocals from Shaffy Bello.

== Reception ==
Upon its release, "Love Me Jeje" was an instant hit and was widely accepted by music lovers thus gaining massive airplay. The song has also been sampled and interpolated by other Nigerian artists years after its release, most notably Tems, who interpolated the Nigerian hip hop song in her 2024 Afrobeats single "Love Me JeJe".

== Remix version ==
"Love Me Jeje (Remix)"
- "Love Me Jeje (Remix)" cover

Single by Seyi Sodimu featuring K. Michelle
- Released: May 30, 2016
- Genre: Hip hop; R&B
- Label: Good Life
- Songwriter(s): Seyi Sodimu; Kimberly Michelle Pate
- Producer(s): Shizzi

Seyi Sodimu singles chronology
"Pele Pele" (2014)	"Love Me Jeje (Remix)" (2016)

K. Michelle singles chronology
"Time" (2016)	"Love Me Jeje (Remix)" (2016)	"Birthday" (2017)

On 30 May 2016, Seyi released the remix of the song with vocal appearance from American singer K. Michelle and musical production from Shizzi. The video for "Love Me Jeje (Remix)" was shot by Sesan Ogunro in Atlanta, U.S. and premiered on YouTube on 30 May 2016.
