= Styl-Plus =

Nigerian R&B and pop musical group

- Origin: Akure, Ondo, Nigeria
- Genres: Pop, R&B
- Years active: 1997–present
- Label: STYL-PLUS
- Members: Shifi Emoefe; Tunde Akinsanmi; Zeal Onyecheme
- Past members: Lanre Faneyi (deceased); Yemi Akinwonmi
- Website: Official Website

The group Styl-Plus (originally STYL) is a Nigerian R&B and pop musical group. The founding members were Shifi Emoefe, Tunde Akinsanmi, Yemi Akinwonmi, and Lanre Faneyi, the name STYL being an abbreviation of the founders' first names.

In 1998, Lanre Faneyi died, and Zeal Onyecheme joined the group. This led to the group being renamed Styl-Plus, the "Plus" denoting the new addition to the group.

In 2002, Yemi Akinwonmi left the group unofficially and the musical band became a trio without adding a new member. Starting 2003, the group officially had its own record label, STYL-PLUS. In October 2025, Akinsanmi stated in an interview with The Sun Nigeria that he did not voluntarily leave the group. He said decisions about the group's future were made without him, leaving him excluded while Emoefe and Onyecheme continued as a duo. Akinsanmi also stated that his temporary stage name "Tunde Tdot" was adopted for legal reasons regarding the group's trademark, and that he later returned to using "Tunde Styl-Plus". Akinsanmi has since released a number of singles under the name "Tunde Styl-Plus."

== History ==
STYL was formed in 1997 in Akure, Nigeria and made up of four members. The group sang mainly pop and love songs.

In 1999, after Lanre Faneyi's death in a swimming accident, they addition of Zeal Onyecheme. The name of the group was changed to Styl-Plus: the plus for Onyecheme. In 2002 Yemi Akinwonmi left the group.

Styl-Plus has been dubbed Africa's "Boyz II Men" due to their ability to deliver heartfelt emotional ballads.

Styl-Plus's first two albums include tracks like "Olufunmi", "Imagine That", "Run Away", "Call My Name", "Stay Alive" and "Four Years". Other releases include "Unbreakable", "Ready to Go", "On the Dance Floor" featuring Jesse Jagz, "Ka Fo Lo (Let's Fly Away)", "Jekeserelo" featuring Chics Bad Boy Slim (produced by Tunde Akinsanmi) and "Baby Mo".

== Releases ==
In late October 2003, under the old management (Joey & T-Jazz), they released two singles to radio stations.

In February 2006, they released their highly anticipated 11 track debut album "Expressions".

In August 2012, the group released "Alive" featuring rapper, Sunky.

Their singles "Olufunmi" and "Runaway" were amongst the most requested love songs on all the major Nigerian R&B radio stations between 2004 and 2005. "Imagine That" is the lead single from their official debut album, Expressions. It has also been a massive chart topper, and has been used in numerous shows, including the pioneer edition of Big Brother Nigeria.

Other songs like "Four Years" and " Iya Basira" were campus hits at the time of their release. Most graduating students still play "Four Years" at their send off party at various universities all over Nigeria.

In December 2016, Shifi and Zeal was signed up by Eskimo Records and shortly released a new single "Aso Ibora" (meaning blanket) a day before Valentine in 2017.

== Awards ==
The group has received numerous Nigerian National awards as well as International awards by Channel O, Amen Awards and Kora Award nominees. In 2005, Call My Name won best R&B video award by Channel O South African music station.

== Discography ==
=== Albums ===
- Expressions (2006)
- Back and Better (2008)
- Unbreakable

=== Selected singles ===
- "Olufunmi"
- "Olufunmi" (Remix) (featuring T Da Kapo)
- "Runaway"
- "Call My Name"
- "Imagine That"
- "Hadiza"
- "Iya Basira"
- "Ima"
- "Always On My Mind"
- "Stay Alive"
- "Drives Me Crazy"
- "Drives Me Crazy" (Remix) (featuring 2 Shotz)
- "Four Years"
- "When You Smile"
- "Aso Ibora"
