= Foushee =

Foushee is a surname. Notable people with the name include:

- Fousheé (Britanny Fousheé; born 1996), American singer-songwriter
- Valerie Foushee (born 1956), American politician, representative for North Carolina's 4th congressional district
- William Foushee (1749–1824), American politician, 1st mayor of Richmond, Virginia
