= Not an Angel =

Single by Tems
- Released: 8 December 2023
- Genre: Alternative R&B; neo-soul; Afrobeats
- Length: 3:05
- Label: RCA
- Songwriter: Temilade Openiyi
- Producers: Sarz; Tems

Tems singles chronology
"Me & U" (2023)	"Not an Angel" (2023)	"Love Me JeJe" (2024)

"Not an Angel" is a song by Nigerian singer, songwriter and record producer Tems, released on 8 December 2023 through RCA Records. Written and produced by Tems alongside Sarz, it marks Tems' first self-produced song since her contributions on her debut EP For Broken Ears.

== Background and release ==
"Not an Angel" is the follow-up to Tems's previous single "Me & U". It was written by her. The song was produced by Sarz and co-produced by Tems. It is the second song Tems has composed as a solo musician since the release of her extended play, If Orange Was a Place, which was released in 2021. "Not an Angel" is an Afrobeats, alternative R&B and neo-soul song that was released alongside a music video, directed by Nakato and Lemost.

== Commercial performance ==
It peaked at No. 9 on the US Billboard World Digital Song Sales, No. 23 on the US Hot R&B Songs chart and No. 28 on the New Zealand Hot Singles chart. Tems performed the song live at the 2024 Billboard Women in Music Award for which she was honored under the Breakthrough category.

== Charts ==
Chart performance for "Not an Angel"
Chart (2023)	Peak position
New Zealand Hot Singles (RMNZ)	28
UK Afrobeats (Official Charts)	3
US Afrobeats Songs (Billboard)	3
US Hot R&B Songs (Billboard)	23
US World Digital Song Sales (Billboard)	9
