= Jagz Nation, Vol. 1: Thy Nation Come =

Studio album by Jesse Jagz
- Released: July 10, 2013
- Recorded: 2012–2013
- Genres: Hip hop; ragga; dancehall
- Length: 80:00
- Label: Jagz Nation
- Producers: Jesse Jagz; Shady Bizniz; Kid Konnect; GuiltyBeatz; Samklef

Jesse Jagz chronology
Jag of All Tradez (2010)	Jagz Nation, Vol. 1: Thy Nation Come (2013)	Jagz Nation, Vol. 2: Royal Niger Company (2014)

Singles from Jagz Nation, Vol. 1: Thy Nation Come
- 1. "Redemption" Released: May 29, 2013; 2. "Bad Girl" Released: July 11, 2013; 3. "Sex & Scotch" Released: January 19, 2014; 4. "God on the Mic" Released: January 23, 2014

Jagz Nation, Vol. 1: Thy Nation Come is the second studio album by Nigerian rapper and record producer Jesse Jagz. It was released by Jagz Nation on July 10, 2013. The album was primarily produced by Jesse Jagz, along with additional production from Shady Bizniz, Kid Konnect, GuiltyBeatz and Samklef. Jagz Nation, Vol. 1: Thy Nation Come has eighteen tracks and features collaborations with 9ice, Wizkid, Brymo, James Maverik and Lindsey Abudei. Musically, the album is a hip hop and ragga project that incorporates elements of dancehall music. Jagz Nation, Vol. 1: Thy Nation Come was supported by the singles "Redemption", "Bad Girl", "Sex & Scotch" and "God on the Mic". The album received generally positive reviews from music critics, who characterized it as a "tour de force" and praised its production.

== Background and promotion ==
Jagz Nation, Vol. 1: Thy Nation Come is the first project released by Jesse Jagz following his departure from Chocolate City in 2012. Jesse Jagz recorded over two hundred songs for the album and worked with producers Kid Konnect, Shady Bizniz, Samklef and GuiltyBeatz. He also reached out to Wizkid, 9ice, Lindsey Abudei and James Maverik for features. Jesse Jagz didn't feature M.I or Ice Prince on the album because he wanted to be the only rapper on it. In an interview with the website MADC.com, he elaborated on the album, saying, "It's just going to be music. With the album I just tried to push the boundary. You know what I mean? Writing, production, arrangement, engineering. I set out to just make good music. Forget about being Nigerian, forget about being in Lagos and just make some good music." Jesse Jagz said he anticipates Jagz Nation, Vol. 1: Thy Nation Come to receive mixed reviews when he drops it and that being gifted in recording and producing added to the album's depth.

Jesse Jagz promoted the album by holding the Jagz Experience Hip-Hop concert at the New Afrika Shrine on August 24, 2013. He told The Punch newspaper he decided to host the album's launch concert at the Shrine for historical reasons and to accommodate some of his financially unstable fans.

== Singles and other releases ==
The album's lead single, "Redemption", was released on May 29, 2013, along with its music video. The song received positive reviews from music critics. OkayAfrica said the record is "anchored on an addictive clink-clank beat and swerving synth melody, which Jesse Jagz expertly rides and molds into a hip-hop-meets-dancehall gem." The Wizkid-assisted track "Bad Girl" was released on July 10, 2013, as the album's second single. The accompanying music video for the song was uploaded to YouTube on December 7, 2013.

"3rd World War", which features a saxophone riff by Femi Kuti, was released on August 7, 2013. It was initially intended to be included on the album's deluxe edition. However, the deluxe edition was never released. The song ended up being released as the lead single from the Heaven's Hell soundtrack. The music video for the album's third single, "Sex & Scotch", was directed by Mex Film Production and released on January 19, 2014. On January 23, Jesse Jagz released the J.O. King-directed animated video for the album's fourth single "God on the Mic".

== Critical reception ==
Professional ratings
Review scores
Source	Rating
Nigerian Entertainment Today	4.3 stars on a 5 point scale
TooXclusive	4/5 stars
360Nobs	8.5/10
TayoTV	8.5/10

Jagz Nation, Vol. 1: Thy Nation Come received positive reviews from music critics. A writer for 360nobs awarded the album an 8.5 rating out of 10, commending its production. Ayomide Tayo of Nigerian Entertainment Today said Jesse Jagz "found the spark that deserted him on his debut" and characterized the album as "bold, refreshing, challenging, illuminating and genius". TooXclusive's Ogaga Sakpaide called the project a "tour de force" and said Jesse Jagz has "magnificently grown and evolved and shows this as he takes the music into a deeper realm compared to his debut offering Jag of All Tradez".

In a review for YNaija, Wilfred Okiche described the record as a "tour de force that suffers occasionally from misbegotten ideas of over-reaching". Okichie also said "Jesse Jagz isn’t quite God on the mic, but he makes a pretty good impression." TayoTV's Ronke Adepoju rated the album 8.5 out of 10, commending its overall production.

=== Accolades ===
Jagz Nation, Vol. 1: Thy Nation Come was nominated for Best Album of the Year at the 2014 Nigeria Entertainment Awards and for Best Rap Album at The Headies 2014.

== Track listing ==
Credits adapted from the website JesseJagz.com.

No.	Title	Writer(s)	Producer(s)	Length
1.	"Intro"	—	—	1:36
2.	"Burning Bush (In Memory of Hadiza Aboki)"	Jesse Garba Abaga	Jesse Jagz	4:34
3.	"Bed of Roses" (featuring James Maverik)	Abaga; James Mavrik	Jesse Jagz	6:02
4.	"Desire"	Abaga	Jesse Jagz	4:53
5.	"Where You at?"	Abaga	Bizniz; Jesse Jagz	5:00
6.	"Mamacita"	Abaga	Jesse Jagz	4:26
7.	"Sex & Scotch"	Abaga; AyCeeX	Jesse Jagz	4:19
8.	"God on the Mic"	Jesse Abaga	Bizniz; Jesse Jagz	3:25
9.	"International"	Abaga	Jesse Jagz	3:24
10.	"Steady Going"	Abaga	Jesse Jagz	5:02
11.	"Jargo" (featuring 9ice)	Abaga; Abolore Akande	Jesse Jagz	4:27
12.	"Pedal to the Floor"	Abaga	Jesse Jagz	6:26
13.	"Sativa Skit"	—	—	0:46
14.	"Sativa" (featuring Lindsey Abudei)	Abaga	Jesse Jagz	5:17
15.	"After Party" (featuring Brymo)	Abaga; Olawale Ashimi	Kid Konnect	4:11
16.	"Redemption"	Abaga	Jesse Jagz	4:25
17.	"Bad Girl" (featuring Wizkid)	Abaga; Ayodeji Balogun	GuiltyBeatz; Jesse Jagz	4:25
18.	"Selassie"	Abaga	Samklef; Jesse Jagz	7:57
Total length:				80:00

Notes

- "—" denotes intro and skit

== Personnel ==
- Jesse Abaga – primary artist, executive producer, writer, arranger, performer, composer
- Shady Bizniz – producer
- Kid Konnect – producer
- Bolaji "Phazehop" Williams – sound engineer
- GuiltyBeatZ – producer
- Samklef – producer
- Ayodeji Balogun – featured artist, performer
- Abolore Akande – featured artist, performer
- Olawale Ashimi – featured artist, performer
- Lindsey Abudei – featured artist, co-performer
- Victoria Kimani – performer
- AyCeeX – writer
- James Mavrik – writer

== Release history ==
Region	Date	Format	Label
Nigeria	July 10, 2013	CD, Digital download	Jagz Nation
