= Jesse Jagz =

Nigerian rapper and producer (born 1984)

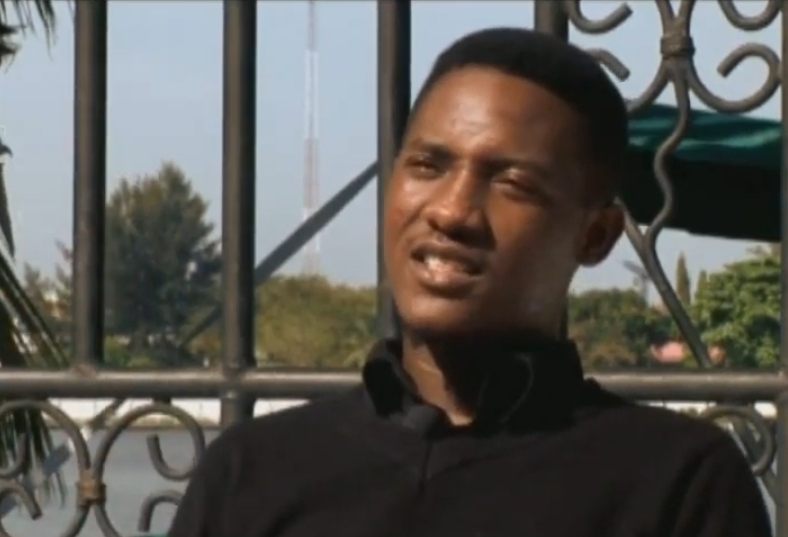

Background information
- Also known as: one ball wonder
- Born: Jesse Garba Abaga; 10 August 1984 (age 42)
- Genres: Hip hop; reggae; dancehall
- Occupations: Rapper; record producer; songwriter
- Years active: 2003–present
- Label: Jagz Nation

Jesse Garba Abaga (born 10 August 1984), known professionally as Jesse Jagz, is a Nigerian rapper, record producer, and songwriter. In 2010, he signed a record deal with Chocolate City and released his debut studio album, Jag of All Tradez, that same year. He voluntarily exited the Chocolate City deal in 2013 and announced the launch of his independent outfit, Jagz Nation. Jesse Jagz released his second studio album, Jagz Nation, Vol. 1: Thy Nation Come, on 10 July 2013. The 18-track album was supported by the singles "Redemption", "Bad Girl", "Sex & Scotch", and "God on the Mic".

His third studio album, Jagz Nation, Vol. 2: Royal Niger Company, was released on 28 March 2014. He returned to Chocolate City in 2015 but left the label again prior to releasing his fourth studio album Odysseus (2017). In May 2020, he released his debut Extended Play (EP) Garba, which comprises five tracks.

== Music career ==
=== 1984–2009: Early life and career beginnings ===
Jesse Garba Abaga was born on 10 August 1984 to Chris and Lydia Abaga. He grew up in Jos and is a member of Taraba State's Jukun ethnic group. His father is a pastor and his mother is a gospel artist and counselor. He joined his church's choir at the age of seven and later learned to play the drums on his parents' drum kit. He recorded an unreleased album with the short-lived music group Gospel Insanity in 2003. A year later, Abaga formed the group Eleven Thirty; they enjoyed local success before disbanding in 2006. Abaga first released music under the stage name Jesse Jagz shortly thereafter with his first hit single "Africa" in 2006, topping the charts of several local radio stations in northern Nigeria. In 2007, three of his singles had similar success, peaking within the Top 10 on several radio charts in the region. Jesse Jagz has produced songs for several artists, including Majek Fashek, M.I Abaga, Banky W, Ice Prince, and Mode 9. In February 2009, he represented Nigeria at the Sauti Za Busara Music Festival.

=== 2010–2013: Jag of All Tradez, Chocolate City exit and Jagz Nation, Vol.1. Thy Nation Come ===
Jesse Jagz released his debut studio album, Jag of All Tradez, on 21 April 2010. It was supported by the singles "Wetin Dey", "Pump It Up", "Jesse Swag", "Sugar Cane Baby", and "Bend Down Low". The album was produced entirely by Jesse Jagz and went platinum in Nigeria two months after its release. Described as a commercially driven pop project, the album was experimental in nature. In an interview with Adeoye Arubayi, Jagz said the album was a learning process and a way for him to explore the different music markets in Nigeria. Jag of All Tradez received generally mixed reviews from music critics. Keeps Magazine commended the album's production and Jesse Jagz's delivery, but ended the review saying that the record should have been shortened to ten songs. Oye Akideinde of 360nobs granted the album an overall verdict of 7.5 out of 10, commending it for being a diverse body of work that contains a "mixture of beats and rhymes that exemplify where Nigerian hip-hop should be today". Adeyinka Yusuff of BellaNaija awarded the album a 5/10 rating, praising its overall production while simultaneously criticizing its experimental nature.

In March 2013, Jesse Jagz announced his voluntary exit from Chocolate City and the launch of his own independent outfit, Jagz Nation. Several media outlets such as Nigerian Entertainment Today and Pulse Nigeria reported that Chocolate City accused Jesse Jagz of owing them money and being a marijuana addict. However, the label debunked the reports through their PR firm, World PR Media. In an interview with Kolapo Olapoju, Jesse Jagz said he left Chocolate City because he got tired performing songs from his Jag of All Tradez album for three consecutive years. Moreover, he told Vanguard newspaper that the label's management had showed little interest in promoting a track he recorded.

Jesse Jagz's second studio album, Jagz Nation, Vol. 1: Thy Nation Come, was released on 10 July 2013. It features collaborations with guest artists such as 9ice, Wizkid, Brymo, James Maverik, and Lindsey Abudei. Jesse Jagz recorded over 200 songs for the album and worked with producers Kid Konnect, Shady Bizniz, Samklef, and GuiltyBeatz. He didn't feature M.I Abaga or Ice Prince on the album because he wanted to be the only rapper on it. In an interview posted on MADC.com, he elaborated on the album, saying "It's just going to be music. With the album I just tried to push the boundary. Writing, production, arrangement, engineering. I set out to just make good music. Forget about being Nigerian, forget about being in Lagos and just make some good music." Jesse Jagz said he expected to receive mixed reviews when he dropped the album and that being gifted in recording and producing added to the album's depth. Jesse Jagz promoted the album by holding the Jesse Jagz Experience concert at the New Afrika Shrine on 24 August 2013. He told The Punch newspaper he decided to host the concert at the Shrine for historical reasons and to accommodate some of his less financially stable fans. Jagz Nation, Vol. 1: Thy Nation Come was nominated for Best Rap Album at The Headies 2014 and for Best Album of the Year at the 2014 Nigeria Entertainment Awards.

The album's lead single, "Redemption", was released on 29 May 2013. OkayAfrica said it is "anchored on an addictive clink-clank beat and swerving synth melody, which Jesse Jagz expertly rides and molds into a hip-hop-meets-dancehall gem." The audio and visuals for "Redemption" were released simultaneously. The Wizkid-assisted track "Bad Girl" was released on 10 July 2013, as the album's second single. Its music video was uploaded to YouTube on 7 December 2013. Contributing a lead single to the Heaven's Hell film soundtrack, Jesse Jagz released the Femi Kuti-assisted track "3rd World War" on 7 August 2013. On 19 January 2014, he released the music video for the album's third single "Sex & Scotch", which was directed by Mex Film Production. On 23 January 2014, Jesse Jagz released the J.O. King-directed animated video for the album's fourth single "God on the Mic".

=== 2014: Jagz Nation Vol. 2: Royal Niger Company ===
Jesse Jagz released his third studio album, Jagz Nation, Vol. 2: Royal Niger Company, on 28 March 2014. He hired fellow musicians Shady, Dugod, Hyce-age, Ibro, and Phazehop to assist with production. The album consists of samples ranging from Rufus & Chaka Khan's "Ain't Nobody" to excerpts from movies such as Network (1976), Scarface (1983), and Johnny Mad Dog (2008). The album features guest appearances and recording samples by Fela Kuti, Tupac, Rufus & Chaka Khan, Tesh Carter, Jumar, Dugod, Sarah Mitaru, Rexx, and Show Dem Camp. Jagz Nation, Vol. 2: Royal Niger Company was originally meant to be a mixtape and was initially titled The Transfiguration of Jesse Jagz. On 28 March 2014, Jesse Jagz made the album available for digital streaming on SoundCloud. On 2 August 2014, he held the second edition of the Jesse Jagz Experience concert at the AGIP Recital Hall; he called it "The Greatest Concert" and performed with a 16-man hip-hop orchestra band.

Jesse Jagz started creating the album by recording a mixture of ideas for two months. After the two-month period, his team sifted through the music and selected the album's final track listing. He chose the album's title to sensitize Nigerians about their history, saying that he made the album for his core fans. He described the album as two steps above Jagz Nation, Vol. 1: Thy Nation Come and said he wanted to stay away from reggae-influenced sounds for sentimental reasons. He hoped people found healing from the album and wanted people who were hurting to find comfort in it. On 17 March 2014, the album's cover art was released to the general public. Inspired by the works of René Magritte, it shows a standing man with his face hidden by an apple. The concept behind Magritte's work revolves around revealing one thing and hiding another. The cover art features a model holding different items that symbolize the culture of Nigeria.

=== 2015–present: The Indestructible Choc Boi Nation, Odysseus, and Garba ===
Jesse Jagz signed a new record deal with Chocolate City in 2015. He produced several tracks on the label's 2015 compilation album The Indestructible Choc Boi Nation (TICBN). The album's release celebrated the merger of Loopy Music and Chocolate City as well as his return. TICBN was released to the general public two weeks following its exclusive release on Star Music. It included the singles "Summer Time" and "Suite 99". In December 2016, Jesse Jagz performed with Femi Kuti and Niniola at a live music concert held at the Sheraton Hotel in Abuja.

In 2017, Jesse Jagz announced his departure from Chocolate City for the second time. He told The Punch newspaper that he left in order to have more creative control over his music. In June 2017, Jesse Jagz unveiled the cover art for his fourth studio album Odysseus on his Instagram profile. The cover features a picture of his mother as a child, sitting with Jan Boer's three biological children. The photo was taken in the grounds of Boer's idyllic Jos home. Jesse Jagz had originally began production on Odysseus in August 2014, and the album was initially scheduled for release in 2015 but was delayed multiple times. Its title was inspired by the Greek king Odysseus. Jesse Jagz performed tracks from the album to select listeners at an Industry Nite event held in June 2017 at Spice Route in Victoria Island, Lagos.

Odysseus was released on 8 September 2017. It features collaborations with Hotyce, Styl-Plus, Cynthia Morgan, Melon, and Burna Boy. Prior to releasing the album, Jesse Jagz released a number of singles in 2017, including "Midnight Vibes" and "New World". "Best in You" was released as a pre-released single. Odysseus draws influences from Caribbean sounds, supporting the dancehall identity that Jesse Jagz embraced on his second studio album Jagz Nation, Vol.1. Thy Nation Come (2013). Although built on a predominantly hip-hop foundation, some of the tracks on Odysseus are infused with Caribbean rhythm and patois-laced rap.

On 29 May 2020, Jesse Jagz released Garba, a 5-track Extended Play (EP) named after his traditional surname. He produced it with assistance from Geekbeatz and Misty. The EP is a mixture of Afropop, trap music, hip-hop, and folk music; it features collaborations with Anchorman and Mr Murph. Motolani Alake of Pulse Nigeria awarded Garba a rating of 6.8 out of 10, praising its production and saying it "beautifully sells Jagz's tales with natural honesty and storytelling". Conversely, Alake criticized Jesse Jagz for letting the EP be about "lyrical brilliance and storytelling" rather than "an out-of-body sonic experience".

== Artistry ==
Jesse Jagz primarily makes hip-hop and reggae, but incorporates elements of other genres into his music. His music utilizes various kinds of instrumentation, auto-tune and echo.

== Personal life ==
Jesse Jagz is the younger brother of rapper and producer M.I Abaga. He has a daughter with singer Ruby Gyang. In July 2020, he married his girlfriend Tolu in a private wedding ceremony, which was held in Jos, Plateau State.

== Discography ==
Studio albums

- Jag of All Tradez (2010)
- Jagz Nation, Vol. 1: Thy Nation Come (2013)
- Jagz Nation, Vol. 2: Royal Niger Company (2014)
- Odysseus (2017)

EPs

- Garba (EP) (2020)

Compilation albums

- The Indestructible Choc Boi Nation (with Chocolate City) (2015)

== Awards and nominations ==
The Headies
Year	Recipient	Award	Result	Ref
2010	Himself	Next Rated	Nominated	
2011	Himself	Producer of the Year for "Oleku" and "Jargo"	Nominated	
2012	Himself	Producer of the Year for Everybody Loves Ice Prince	Nominated	
2014	Himself	Lyricist on the Roll for "God on the Mic"	Won	
2014	"Bad Girl" (featuring Wizkid)	Best Reggae/Dancehall Single	Nominated	
2014	Jagz Nation, Vol. 1: Thy Nation Come	Best Rap Album	Nominated	
2016	Best Reggae/Dancehall Single	"Body Hot" (Praiz featuring Jesse Jagz and Stonebwoy)	Nominated	
2016	Best Reggae/Dancehall Single	"Jagga Love"	Nominated	
Nigeria Entertainment Awards
Year	Recipient	Award	Result	Ref
2010	Himself	Best New Act of the Year	Won	
2010	Himself	Best Rap Act of the Year	Nominated	
2012	Himself	Best Music Producer of the Year	Nominated	
2013	Himself	Best Rap Act of the Year	Nominated	
2014	Jagz Nation, Vol. 1: Thy Nation Come	Best Album of the Year	Nominated	
The Future Awards Africa
2010	Himself	Music Producer of the Year	Won	
Channel O Music Video Awards
2014	"Bad Girl" (featuring Wizkid)	Most Gifted Ragga Dancehall	Nominated	
