= Shallipopi =

Nigerian singer and rapper (born 2000)

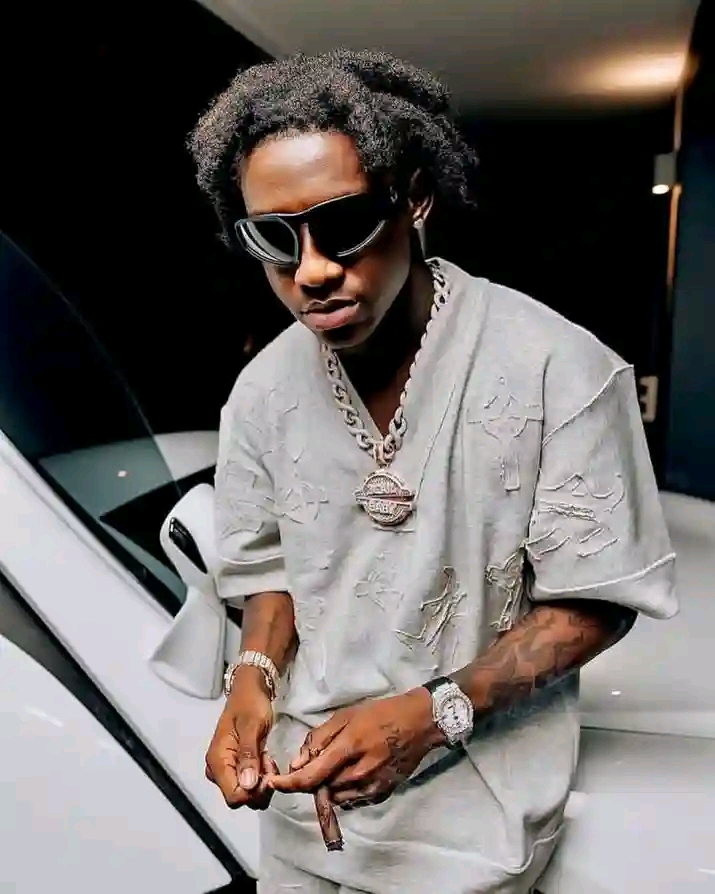
- Shallipopi in 2023

Background information
- Also known as: Presido De La Pluto
- Born: Crown Uzama; 12 April 2000 (age 26); Benin City, Edo, Nigeria
- Genres: Afrobeats; Afrobeat; afropop; amapiano; trap
- Occupations: Singer; rapper
- Instrument: Vocals
- Years active: 2010–present
- Labels: Plutomania Records; Since 93
- Website: www.theycallmeshallipopi.com

Crown Uzama (born 12 April 2000), known professionally as Shallipopi, is a Nigerian singer, rapper, and songwriter. He gained recognition in 2023 with the release of his single, "Elon Musk". He followed up with the extended play Planet Pluto (2023). His debut studio album, Presido La Pluto, released in 2023, was met with commercial success, debuting at number 1 on the TurnTable Top 100 (Top 50 at the time). It also debuted atop Apple Music's⁣⁣ Top 100 albums.

Shallipopi's second studio album, Shakespopi (2024) became Shallipopi's second chart-topping album. The song "ASAP" from the album reached number one on the TurnTable Top 100. In 2025, he released the single "Laho", which became his most successful single to date, becoming certified four-times platinum in Nigeria. Shallipopi then released his fourth studio album Auracle (2025), which reached number four on the TurnTable Top 100.

== Early life and education ==
Crown Uzama was born on 12 April 2000 in Benin City, Edo State, and is one of five children born to an Edo family. He is the older brother of Plutomania Records signees Zerrydl and Famous Pluto. Uzama grew up hearing traditional Nigerian music from his father and reggae from his mother.

Uzama's family struggled financially, and he worked as a bricklayer, painter, and plasterer prior to pursuing a music career. Uzama and his brothers also pursued dancing and comedy, filming YouTube videos with a neighbor's cell phone.

He graduated from Auchi Polytechnic in 2023.

== Career ==
=== 2015–2023: Career beginnings, Planet Pluto and Presido La Pluto ===
Shallipopi began his career in 2015 after his brother Zerrydl. The brothers used the app To Me to record their early music. Starting in 2020, Shallipopi began uploading his music to social media platforms including TikTok.

In late 2021, he released his debut single, "Gra Gra". In 2022, he released the singles "Power" and "Shaka". He achieved a breakthrough with the release of his single "Elon Musk" in March 2023. The song became a sleeper hit and led to the release of his subsequent single "Sharpiru" on 20 April 2023. Following the success of "Elon Musk", Shallipopi released a remix first featuring Zlatan on 18 May 2023. The remix achieved further success, with the song gaining popularity in both the United States and Europe. On 20 June 2023, Apple Music announced Shallipopi as the latest featured artist in its Up Next program in Nigeria.

On 23 June 2023, another remix of "Elon Musk" was released, featuring Fireboy DML. He then followed it with the single "Ex Convict" on 7 July, with an accompanying music video. "Ex Convict" debuted at number 6 on the TurnTable Top 100. The song served as the lead single for his debut extended play, announced on 10 July. On 14 July 2023, Shallipopi released his debut EP, Planet Pluto, featuring guest appearances by Pa Monday-Edo, Zlatan, and Fireboy DML.

On 20 August 2023, he was featured on "So What", a song by fellow singer Tekno. He released two singles, "Things on Things" and "Oscroh (Pepperline)", on 13 October. On 20 October 2023, he was featured on the remix of "Puff & Pass" a song by Zerrydl. In 2023, he launched his own record label named Plutomania Records and simultaneously signed music acts Zerry DL and Tega Boi. He released "Evil Receive" on 8 November. The following day, on 9 November, he released three singles: "Over the Seas" featuring Focalistic, "Wet on Me" featuring Zerry DL, and "Cast" featuring Odumodublvck.

His debut studio album, Presido La Pluto, was released later in November 2023, featuring many of the previously released singles.

=== 2024–present: Shakespopi ===
On 9 February 2024, Shallipopi was featured on The Real Prechly's song "A Collision of Two Worlds 2.0" alongside others. On 11 April 2024, he released his second album Shakespopi with guest appearances by Reehaa, Tegaboi dc, and Jeneral. It debuted at number one on the TurnTable Top 100 Albums. On 12 June 2024, Shallipopi was featured on King Promise's single "Continental". On 20 June 2024, he was featured on Rema's song "Benin Boys" from the album Heis. The track became a huge success, gaining one million streams on its first day and debuting atop the TurnTable Top 100.

On 21 June 2024, singer Victony released his debut studio album, Stubborn, which featured guest appearances from Shallipopi and Asake. Shallipopi was featured on the track "Ludo" from the album. The song achieved chart success, reaching number 21 on the TurnTable Top 100 and number 7 on the Official Radio Songs chart.

In July 2024, Shallipopi performed "Benin Boys" alongside Rema and Zerry DL at the 2024 UK Wireless Festival.

=== 2025-present: Auracle and WayWard ===
On 13 March 2025, Shallipopi released the single "Laho". It quickly achieved viral success, with a remix featuring Burna Boy releasing a month later. Weeks prior, Oba Ewuare II requested that Shallipopi perform "Laho" when he visited his palace. Shallipopi obliged by performing the single acapella as members of the royal palace joined in. On 23 May, he collaborated with Dutch rapper Frenna on the song "Zaazaa". On 17 July, Shallipopi released another remix of "Laho" with Puerto Rican singer Rauw Alejandro. On 22 July he appeared on the remix of "Escaladizzy" by fellow Nigerian singer Mavo. On 5 September, Shallipopi released the single "Na So" after anticipation from fans. A month later he followed up with the single "Him" featuring American rapper Gunna.

On 26 November 2025 Shallipopi announced his fourth studio album, Auracle. It was subsequently released on 5 December. The album peaked at number four on the TurnTable albums chart. On 12 June 2026 Shallipopi released the single "Allergies". On 23 October he surprise-released the EP WayWard.

== Legal issues ==
On 30 May 2023, the Economic and Financial Crimes Commission arrested Shallipopi, his manager and others for alleged Internet-related fraud. Shallipopi, his manager and others were convicted on 23 June 2023 and sentenced to two years imprisonment with the option of a fine.

== Discography ==
=== Albums ===
Title	Details
Planet Pluto (EP)	Release date: 10 July 2023; Label: Plutomania, Dvpper Music; Format: Digital download
Presido La Pluto	Release date: 9 November 2023; Label: Plutomania, Dvpper Music; Format: Digital download
Shakespopi	Release date: 12 April 2024; Label: Plutomania, Dvpper Music; Format: Digital download
Auracle	Release date: 5 December 2025; Label: Plutomania, Since '93; Format: Digital download

=== Singles ===
Title	Release date	Album
"Elon Musk"	14 March 2023	Planet Pluto
"Sharpiru"	20 April 2023	Planet Pluto
"Ex Convict"	7 July 2023	Planet Pluto
"Things on Things"	13 October 2023	Presido La Pluto
"Oscroh (Pepperline)"	13 October 2023	Presido La Pluto
"Evil Receive"	8 November 2023	Presido La Pluto
"Benin Boys"	21 June 2024	Heis
"Laho"	13 March 2025	Auracle

== Awards and nominations ==
Year	Awards ceremony	Awards ceremony	Nominated work	Results	Ref
2025	The Headies	Best Rap Single	"Cast" (featuring Odumodublvck)	Won	
2025	BET Awards	Best New International Act	Himself	Nominated	
