= Love Me JeJe =

Single by Tems

from the album Born in the Wild
- Released: 26 April 2024
- Genre: Afrobeats; R&B
- Length: 2:58
- Label: RCA
- Songwriters: Temilade Openiyi; Seyi Sodimu
- Producers: GuiltyBeatz; Spax

Tems singles chronology
"Not an Angel" (2023)	"Love Me JeJe" (2024)	"Burning" (2024)

Music video
- "Love Me JeJe" on YouTube

"Love Me JeJe" is a song by Nigerian singer Tems, released on 26 April 2024, via RCA Records. It serves as the second single from her debut studio album, Born in the Wild (2024). Produced by GuiltyBeatz and Spax, the song interpolates Seyi Sodimu's 1997 single "Love Me Jeje". However whereas Sodimu's song is Nigerian hip-hop, Tems brings the song into an Afrobeats landscape. The song won Best African Music Performance at the 67th Annual Grammy Awards.

== Background and composition ==
"Love Me JeJe" interpolates Seyi Sodimu's 1997 hit song "Love Me Jeje", which also features vocals by Shaffy Bello. On 22 April, Tems announced that the song would be released on 25 April, and performed it for the first time during her Coachella 2024 set. "Love Me JeJe" was released after she announced that her debut studio album, Born in the Wild, would be out in May. Tems told Apple Music 1 that the song originated during a freestyle session she had with friends and that one of them interpolated Sodimu's "Love Me Jeje". Tems loved the original track and chose to include it in her recording. Pitchfork said the song fuses Afrobeats with R&B.

== Music video ==
Prior to releasing the official music video for "Love Me JeJe", Tems made a visualizer for the song and uploaded it to YouTube on 26 April 2024. The official music video premiered on 3 May 2024. She directed the official video and filmed it at various locations across Lagos; the video serves as an ode to her hometown. In the video's opening scene, Tems is shown having fun with her friends at a karaoke bar. Later, she is seen singing and dancing in the streets of Lagos while riding a tricycle and standing in a moving truck. The video also features evening scenes of the singer dancing with friends at a party. Moreover, it contains footage of Tems singing the song's bridge with Sodimu.

== Live performances ==
Tems performed the song for the first time on her debut Coachella set and on the American late-night talk show The Tonight Show Starring Jimmy Fallon in May 2024, her debut appearance on the series. Tems performed the song during the halftime show of the 2025 FIFA Club World Cup final.

== Accolades ==
Accolades for "Love Me JeJe"
Year	Ceremony	Award	Result	Ref.
2024	MTV Video Music Awards	Best Afrobeats	Nominated	
2025	Grammy Awards	Best African Music Performance	Won	
2025	NAACP Image Awards	Outstanding International Song	Nominated	

== Charts ==
Chart performance for "Love Me JeJe"
Chart (2024–2025)	Peak position
Australia Hitseekers (ARIA)	20
Ireland (IRMA)	94
Netherlands (Single Top 100)	92
New Zealand Hot Singles (RMNZ)	11
Nigeria (TurnTable Top 100)	14
UK Singles (Official Charts)	36
UK Afrobeats (Official Charts)	1
UK Hip Hop/R&B (Official Charts)	4
US Afrobeats Songs (Billboard)	3
US Hot R&B/Hip-Hop Songs (Billboard)	41
US Rhythmic Airplay (Billboard)	40
US World Digital Song Sales (Billboard)	5

== Certifications ==
Certifications for "Love Me JeJe"
Region	Certification	Certified units/sales
New Zealand (RMNZ)	Platinum	30,000^{‡}
Nigeria (TCSN)	Gold	50,000^{‡}
United Kingdom (BPI)	Gold	400,000^{‡}
^{‡} Sales+streaming figures based on certification alone.

== Release history ==
Release history for "Love Me JeJe"
Region	Date	Format	Label	Ref.
Various	26 April 2024	Digital download; streaming	RCA; Since '93	
United States	20 May 2024	Urban contemporary radio	RCA; Since '93	
Italy	21 June 2024	Radio airplay		
