= Zerrydl =

Nigerian rapper and singer (born 2002)

- Born: Divine Uzama; December 4, 2002 (age 23); Benin City, Edo, Nigeria
- Origin: Benin City
- Genres: Afrobeats; afrobeat; amapiano
- Occupations: Rapper; singer; songwriter
- Years active: 2015–present
- Labels: Dapper; Plutomania (current)
- Relatives: Shallipopi (brother); Famous Pluto (brother)
- Member of: Plutomanias
- Website: zerrydl.com

Divine Uzama (born December 4, 2002), known professionally as Zerrydl or Zerry DL, is a Nigerian rapper and singer. He embarked on his musical career in 2015, sharing freestyles on social media. He first gained major recognition in 2023 following the release of his single "Puff & Pass," which marked his first entry on the TurnTable Top 100. He signed with Plutomania Records to release his debut extended play (EP) Danger Zee (2023). The following year, he released the single "Back to Back"—marking his first Billboard appearance.

== Early life ==
Uzama was born on December 4, 2002, in Benin City, Edo State. He was raised by his parents. His older brother is Afrobeats singer Shallipopi. His younger brother, Famous Pluto, is also a singer.

== Career ==
Uzama began his music career alongside his elder brother Shallipopi, sharing freestyles and song covers on social media in 2015. In 2022, Zerrydl released his first single, "Ifeoma", although it did not chart, it garnered some attention. In 2023, Zerrydl signed a recording contract with Shallipopi's Plutomania Records. That same year he released the hit single "Puff & Pass" on July 9, 2023. The single debuted at number 39 on the Nigeria TurnTable 100 charts, making it Zerrydl's first entry on the chart.

On October 20, 2023, Zerrydl released the remix of "Puff & Pass" with Shallipopi. Its accompanying music video was released that same day and currently has 5.4 million views on YouTube, as of November 2024. On November 10, 2023, Zerrydl was featured on Shallipopi's "Wet on Me".

On December 15, 2023, Uzama released his debut extended play Danger Zee, which debuted at number 14 on the Official Top 50 Albums Chart. In 2024, he released the single "O.U.A.T" on May 23, which became the lead single for his second EP, Wara Wara Szn, featuring Seyi Vibez, and Tega Boi Dc, released on May 31.

In July 2024, Uzama performed alongside his brother Shallipopi and Nigerian rapper Rema at the 2024 Wireless Festival, a prominent music event held in various cities across the UK. Uzama also released the single "Back to Back" on September 23, 2024, which debuted at number 40 on the TurnTable charts 100. On October 19, 2024, Uzama's single "Back to Back" reached its peak position at number 16 on the UK Official Afrobeats Chart. "Back to Back" debuted at number 42 on the Billboard U.S. Afrobeats Songs chart, marking his first Billboard appearance.

== Discography ==
=== EPs ===
List of extended plays, with selected details
Title	Details	Peak chart positions
Title	Details	NG
Danger Zee	Released: December 15, 2023; Label: Plutomania, Dapper; Formats: Digital download, streaming	87
Wara Wara Szn	Released: May 31, 2024; Label: Plutomania, Dapper; Formats: Digital download, streaming	—

=== Singles ===
- "Ifeoma" featuring Iamemzyfrush1 (2022)
- "Puff & Pass" (2023)
- "Puff & Pass (Remix)" featuring Shallipopi (2023)
- "O.U.A.T" (2024)
- "Back to Back" (2024)

== Awards and nominations ==
Year	Awards ceremony	Award description(s)	Nominated work	Results	Ref
2025	The Headies	Rookie of the Year	Himself	Won	
