= If Orange Was a Place =

EP by Tems
- Released: 15 September 2021
- Genre: Alternative R&B; Alté
- Length: 18:13
- Label: Since '93; RCA
- Producer: GuiltyBeatz; Jonah Christian

Tems chronology
For Broken Ears (2020)	If Orange Was a Place (2021)	Born in the Wild (2024)

Singles from If Orange Was a Place
- 1. "Crazy Tings" Released: 15 September 2021

If Orange Was a Place is the second (and first major label) extended play by Nigerian singer, songwriter and producer Tems. It was produced primarily by GuiltyBeatz, along with production from Jonah Christian, and was released on 15 September 2021 by Since '93 and RCA. It features a single guest appearance from American singer Brent Faiyaz.

== Background and release ==
On 6 September 2021, Tems announced via her Twitter handle that her second EP was set to be released the next week. A week later Tems released the track listing, accompanied by a trailer for the EP revealing Brent Faiyaz as the only guest artist and Ghanaian producer GuiltyBeatz as the EP's primary producer, with additional production from Jonah Christian.

If Orange Was a Place was released on 15 September 2021 by RCA/Since '93, revealing that Tems had signed a recording deal with the label.

== Critical reception ==
Professional ratings
Review scores
Source	Rating
Pitchfork	7.0/10
Rolling Stone	4/5 stars

The EP reviewed positive reviews from critics. A review from Pitchfork stated that "If Orange Was a Place takes on a different texture and mood. If there's any element still resonant, it's Tems' unrestricted expression." Rolling Stone praised the EP while also stating that it "broadens Tems' budding discography across moods and tempos, uniting all her strengths in a multi-faceted display of self-actualization". A mixed review from Pulse Nigeria wrote that "this isn't music to be judged harshly - if it can be judged at all. It's just music to be enjoyed and understood."

== Accolades ==
Awards and nominations for If Orange Was a Place
Year	Organization	Award	Result
2022	The Headies	Best R&B Album	Won
2022	South African Music Awards	Best of Africa	Won

== Track listing ==
All tracks are written by Temilade Openiyi, except where noted.

If Orange Was a Place track listing
No.	Title	Writer(s)	Producer(s)	Length
1.	"Crazy Tings"		GuiltyBeatz	3:02
2.	"Found" (featuring Brent Faiyaz)	Temilade Openiyi; Christopher Brent Wood	GuiltyBeatz	3:29
3.	"Replay"		Jonah Christian	3:00
4.	"Avoid Things"		GuiltyBeatz	3:44
5.	"Vibe Out"		GuiltyBeatz	4:57
Total length:				18:13

== Charts ==
Chart performance for If Orange Was a Place
Chart (2021)	Peak position
US Heatseekers Albums (Billboard)	9
US World Albums (Billboard)	7
