= Since '93 =

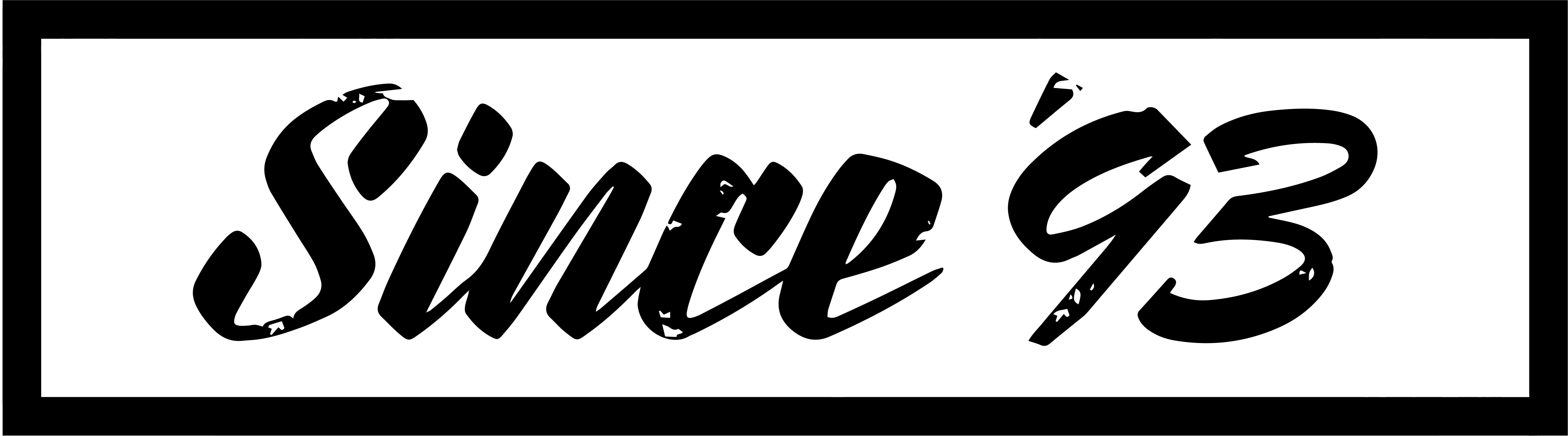
- Founded: 2012 (fka Avant Garde Music)
- Founder: Riki Bleau
- Genre: Black music; hip-hop; R&B; Afrobeat
- Country of origin: United Kingdom
- Official website: since93.com

Since '93 is an English entertainment company. It encompasses a record label, music publishing firm and talent agency.

Founded by serial entrepreneur Riki Bleau in 2012, the company (formally known as Avant Garde Music) is predominantly known for its music business - in recent years its record label joint venture Since '93, with Sony Music Entertainment and music executive Glyn Aikins, have broken multiple artists including: Aitch, Cat Burns, Fredo, Loski, Tems and Tyla.

In 2020, Forbes noted Bleau and Aikins as executives who have significantly contributed to the rise of UK rap in recent decades. In 2024, the two – plus colleague Joe Iddison – were recognised at the Music Business UK Awards as winners of ‘A&R Of The Year – Adult Contemporary’.

Bleau is an alumnus of the Powerful Media Powerlist, featuring Britain's most influential people of African and African Caribbean heritage.

== History ==
=== Formation and early years ===
The company began as Avant Garde Music in 2012, founded by Riki Bleau. It focused on artist management and music publishing (historically a venture with Delirious Blacksmith Management and Stellar Songs), working with Emeli Sandé, Labrinth, Naughty Boy, Sam Smith, and more.

Bleau and Aikins first started working together with Riki’s first management client Naughty Boy, signing him to Virgin EMI. They met future client Emeli Sandé through him and worked her debut studio album, Our Version of Events, that debuted at #1 in the UK and went on to sell millions of copies globally, achieving multi-platinum and BRIT award-winning status.

The first release on post-Avant Garde Music rebranding as Since '93 was Sneakbo track ‘Too Cool (Right Here)’ via EMI.

=== Sony Music Entertainment joint venture ===
In 2018, Since ’93 launched as a new label and joint venture with Sony Music Entertainment – affiliated with the RCA label group in London.

Early signings included fast-rising Manchester MC Aitch, a Top 5 mixtape from rapper Fredo, and drill music artist Loski attracting co-signs from industry peers Drake, Skepta, Stormzy and Giggs.

=== 2020s ===
Key successes in this era include: Aitch's AitcH20 project and tracks ‘Taste (Make It Shake)' and 'Buss Down'; the rise and breakthrough of UK artist Cat Burns with multiple BRIT Award nominations and single ‘Go’ peak #2 in the UK and become the fourth biggest-selling single from a female artist in 2022, and fourth in the year-end charts while charting and going platinum in multiple international territories. Additionally, Since '93 won the 2023 Music Week Artist Marketing Award for work on this Cat Burns campaign, and the artist's first studio album Early Twenties peaked #7 in the UK and received a 2024 Mercury Prize nomination.

Tems is co-signed with RCA US and was recognised as the 2024 Billboard Women in Music Breakthrough Award winner, her debut studio album Born in the Wild achieved wide global commercial success and featured on end-year Critics' lists. She is the first Nigerian artist to win multiple Grammy Awards.

Tyla is co-signed with RCA/Epic and won the first-ever Grammy for Best African Music Performance in 2024.

Up-and-coming artist Qing Madi was recognised as Billboard African Rookie of the Month in February 2025. In April 2025, one-to-watch Shallipopi’s ‘Laho’ is in the YouTube Top 100 music videos with multiple-millions of views.

== Celebrating black culture ==
Since '93 invests in and promotes Black British music, lifestyle and culture. It hosts annual events recognising and celebrating black executives in the music industry, including a Black History Month dinner, and exclusive Black Excellence BRITs After Party.

== Roster ==
=== Current Artists ===
- Cat Burns
- DDG
- Foushee
- Khamari
- Loski
- Mette
- Russ Millions
- Small God
- Spoony
- Tems
- TSB
- Tyla

=== Management clients ===
- 413
- ASCO
- DC
- Krept and Konan
- Loski
- Mojam
- Naughty Boy
- Popcaan
- Tunde
- Vee Brown
- Zeze Millz

=== Publishing clients ===
- 4 Play Kels
- BPM
- Emeli Sandé
- Eyelar
- iO
- Joffstar
- Labrinth
- Robin Knightz
- Sam Smith

=== Sport ===
- DDG
- Sam Morsy
- Idris El Mizouni
- Armando Dobra

=== Partnerships ===
- Wizkid
- GRAFT3R
- MEET MARLEY
