= Seyi Sodimu =

Nigerian singer-songwriter

- Also known as: Love Me jeje
- Born: Lagos state, Nigeria
- Origin: Abeokuta, Ogun state, Nigeria
- Occupations: Singer, songwriter, performer
- Years active: 1998

Seyi Sodimu (also known as Mr. Jeje or Seyi) is a Nigerian singer-songwriter. He is best known for his hit Nigerian hip-hop single "Love Me Jeje", which featured Afro-soul vocals from Shaffy Bello. It was released in 1997 and made him popular in Nigeria in the late 1990s and early 2000s. He is a pioneer of the ever-growing Nigerian Music Industry.

== Early life ==
Seyi was born on Lagos Island on 30 June to a large family from Abeokuta, Ogun State. He grew up in Lagos where he attended The Fountain School Surulere for his elementary education and completed his secondary school education at Igbobi College, Yaba.

Seyi travelled to the United States in the late 1980s to continue his education. He attended Prince George's Community College in Maryland where he graduated with an associate degree in Computer Information Systems. While in college Seyi started writing poems and stories for the school magazine, and was commended by his professors and peers. He then decided to start writing songs. He later took voice and piano lessons, to perfect his craft. While in college Seyi befriended American part-time DJ from Howard University in Washington, DC, Carl Bassey who teamed up with Seyi to co-produce his songs.

== Career ==
=== 1997–2003 ===
After saving up enough money, Carl's American musical background and Seyi's African musical influence resulted in the release of Seyi's first album entitled Born in Afrika in 1998, which contained the hit song "Love me jeje, love me tender". The album was released under Shakara Entertainment. This album topped the charts in Nigeria on Ray Power 100 FM and sold over 30,000 copies in the first weeks of its release. The album also earned him nominations and awards in Nigeria.

In 2003, Seyi released his sophomore album State of Mind under Goodlife Entertainment. This album contained the hit "Money Man" and a tribute to Fela, "Fela the King". "Money man" topped the charts in Nigeria and was on heavy rotation by several radio stations including Choice FM radio in London.

Seyi's albums were independently produced. Seyi wrote and co-produced all the songs. Carl Bassey and Seyi co-produced Born in Afrika. State of Mind was predominantly produced by Seyi. Chris Biondo was the sound engineer for both albums and Seyi's subsequent singles with the exception of "Pele Pele".

Seyi performed at the Washington, DC Press Club, performed alongside Wyclef Jean, worked with Ginuwine and collaborated with reggae star Wayne Wonder.

=== 2007–present ===
In 2007, Seyi released a song with reggae star Wayne Wonder called "Sophisticated Lady". A year later, Seyi released a song and video for "Set Me Free" directed by Ayoola Daramola.

In 2012, Seyi released another single "GBEDU".

In 2014, Seyi released "Pele Pele", a remake of Ebenezer Obey's "ore mi se pele pele". Seyi diversified into other business ventures, including real estate, fashion and automotive. "Pele Pele" was produced by Lagos Hitmaker Shizzi. The video was directed and shot by Sesan Ogunro of film factory in a serene location in London.

== Personal life ==
Seyi is married to a Nigerian woman from Ondo state and has two children, a boy and a girl. His wife is an entrepreneur who runs a group of schools. His daughter is a songwriter and sings backup on a lot of Seyi's tracks.

== Discography ==
=== Albums ===
- 1998: Born in Afrika
- 2002: State of Mind

=== Singles ===
Born In Afrika (1998)

- "The Birth"
- "Come Sing Our Song"
- "The Way We Are"
- "Almighty"
- "AYO"
- "Love me jeje"
- "Don't Blame"
- "Talking Drum"
- "Moni Jesu"
- "Come Sing Our Song"
- "The Way We Are" (House Remix)

State of Mind (2002)

- "State of Mind"
- "Mo De"
- "Money Man"
- "Dying Young"
- "Give it to me"
- "Fela the King" (tribute to Fela)
- "Here We Go"
- "Oluwa Seun"
- "Money Man" (Reprise)
- 2007: "Sophisticated Woman" ft Wayne Wonder
- 2008: "Set Me Free" ft Shafy Akinrimisi
- 2009: "Boys Will be Boys"
- 2012: "Gbedu"
- 2014: "Pele Pele"
