= GuiltyBeatz =

- Born: Ronald Banful; Palermo, Italy
- Origin: Accra, Ghana
- Genres: Afrobeats; electro house; dance-pop
- Occupations: Record Producer, disc jockey
- Years active: 2010–present
- Website: www.guiltybeatz.com

Ronald Banful (born January 17, 1990), known professionally as GuiltyBeatz, is a Ghanaian DJ and record producer.

== Early life ==
GuiltyBeatz was born in Palermo, Italy, and moved to Ghana at age six. He received his first piano at the age of 1. At the age of 12, GuiltyBeatz began to create beats with the "Music DJ" application on his Sony Ericsson phone. He started to write beats for rap battles in Junior High School.

At age 17, GuiltyBeatz received a personal computer which enabled him to study beat making with Fruity Loops. He improved by recreating beats from hit songs in the American Music Industry. GuiltyBeatz is a self-taught pianist.

In April 2010, GuiltyBeatz was signed to the Ghanaian record label Star Productions. He then began using Logic Pro for music production. Guilty has worked with Ghanaian musical acts such as Sarkodie, R2Bees, Efya, DCryme, Atumpan, Stonebwoy, Pappy Kojo, Jeed Rogers, Chase, Mr Eazi, Bisa Kdei.

He has also has worked with artists from outside Ghana, such as Jesse Jagz, Wizkid, Wande Coal, Cabo Snoop (Angola), KaySwitch and Mr. Walz in Nigeria. He has also worked with UK artists Mr Silva, Sway, Tribal Magz and Moelogo.

== Musical career ==
Guiltybeatz started his music production career actively when he joined Star Productions (S.T.A.R Baby) in 2010. He began deejaying in 2018. As an Afro-Pop producer, GuiltyBeatz released his debut single, "Chance" featuring Mr. Eazi, in 2016.

=== 2018: Akwaaba ===
GuiltyBeatz in 2018 released "Akwaaba" that featured Mr Eazi, Patapaa, Pappy Kojo. In 2018, "Akwaaba" was first ranked by Face2Face Africa on its list of "Top 10 most popular African songs of 2018". This track turned out to be his big break, and got him several awards and nominations.

=== 2019: The Lion King: The Gift ===
GuiltyBeatz has production credits for three songs on Beyoncé's album The Lion King: The Gift in 2019. He has production credits for three songs off the album namely, "Already", "Keys to The Kingdom" and "Find Your Way Back".

== Discography ==
=== EPs ===
- Different (2020)

=== Songs ===
Title	Artistes	Year
Chance (Fre Me)	GuiltyBeatz featuring Mr Eazi	2016
Nobody Dey	GuiltyBeatz featuring Mr Eazi x Omo Fuji	2016
You can go	GuiltyBeatz featuring G-west	2017
Fire	GuiltyBeatz featuring King Promise X Joeboy	2018
Akwaaba	GuiltyBeatz Featuring Mr Eazi x Patapaa x Pappy Kojo	2018
Genging	GuiltyBeatz featuring Joey B	2019
Pilolo	GuiltyBeatz Featuring Mr Eazi x Kwesi Arthur	2019
Freedom	GuiltyBeatz, Mr Eazi x J.Derobie feat. Sherrie Silver	2019

=== Production credits ===
Title	Artistes	Year
Tell Me Your Name	Chase featuring Paedae produced by GuiltyBeatz	2011
Getaway	Efya produced by GuiltyBeatz	2013
Bad Girl	Jesse Jagz featuring Wizkid produced by GuiltyBeatz	2013
Gidigidi	Gage Noi featuring Rashid Metal	2014
No way	Pappy Kojo produced by GuiltyBeatz	2017
Abena	Pappy Kojo featuring Mr Eazi and Bisa Kdei produced by Guiltyz Beatz	2017
Die from your love	Abonda featuring GuiltyBeatz	2018
1 man 1000	Flowking Stone produced by GuiltyBeatz	2018
Do you	Sarkodie featuring Mr Eazi produced by GuiltyBeatz	2019
Ogye Me Din	Mugueez (R2Bees) produced by GuiltyBeatz	2019
Happiness	King Promise produced by GuiltyBeatz	2019
Bra	King Promise featuring Kojo Antwi produced by GuiltyBeatz	2019
Snack	Ms. Banks produced by GuiltyBeatz	2019
Thank you	Mr Eazi produced by GuiltyBeatz	2019
Bogada	A-star featuring GuiltyBeatz	2019
Bounce	Kida Kudz produced by GuiltyBeatz	2019
Already	Beyonce featuring Shatta Wale and Major Lazer produced by GuiltyBeatz^{[a]}	2019
Find Your Way Back (Circle of Life)	Beyonce produced by GuiltyBeatz^{[b]}	2019
Keys to the Kingdom	Beyonce featuring Tiwa Savage and Mr Eazi produced by Guilty Beatz^{[a]}	2019
If Orange Was a Place	Tems produced by Guilty Beatz^{[a]}	2021
Me & U	Tems produced by Guilty Beatz^{[a]}	2023
Love Me JeJe	Tems produced by Guilty Beatz^{[a]}	2024

Notes

- ^{^[a]} signifies a co-producer
- ^{^[b]} signifies a miscellaneous producer

== Awards and nominations ==
Year	Award ceremony	Prize	Recipient	Ref
2018	All Africa Music Awards	Best African Collaboration	Won	
2018	All Africa Music Awards	Song of the Year	Won	
2019	Vodafone Ghana Music Awards	Afropop Song of the Year	Won	
2019	Vodafone Ghana Music Awards	Best African Collaboration	Won	
2019	3Music Awards	Producer of the Year	Nominated	
2019	3Music Awards	Viral Song of the Year	Nominated	
