= 17th Headies Awards =

Nigerian music industry awards

- Date: 27 April 2025
- Location: Victoria Island, Lagos
- Country: Nigeria
- Hosted by: Nancy Isime
- Most awards: Rema, Davido & Qing Madi (2)
- Most nominations: Rema (9)
- Website: theheadies.com

Television/radio coverage
- Network: HipTV

The 17th Headies Awards were held on 27 April 2025, at the Landmark Event Centre in Lagos. Themed "Back to Base", the event was hosted by Nancy Isime and marked the award's return to Nigeria after two consecutive editions in Atlanta. The nominees were announced in February 2025, with new categories introduced, including "Soundtrack of the Year" and "Best Performer (Live)". The awards show was initially scheduled to hold on 5 April.

The ceremony was affected by technical difficulties and scheduling issues, causing it to end abruptly before winners were announced in categories such as Best R&B Single, Best Collaboration, and Best Rap Album. Zerrydl won the Rookie of the Year award, while Odumodublvck received the Next Rated award. Other notable winners included Lojay (Best Vocal Performance – Male), Liya (Best Vocal Performance – Female), London (Producer of the Year), Erigga (Best Rap Album), and Davido (Digital Artiste of the Year). Tems' "Burning" won Best Recording of the Year, while Asake's "Lonely at the Top" was named Song of the Year. Chike and MohBad's "Egwu" won both Best Collaboration and Viewer's Choice, with MohBad also receiving a posthumous Best Street-Hop Artiste award. Flavour performed a medley of his songs during the ceremony.

== Performers ==
Artist(s)	Song(s)
Qing Madi	"See Finish" "American Love"
L.A.X	"Ginger" "Caro"
Odumodublvck	"Pity This Boy"
KCee	"Pullover" "Ojapiano"
Shallipopi	"Cast" "Laho"
Flavour	"Nwa Baby" "Big Baller" "Game Changer (Dike)"
Ayo Maff	"Dealer" "Are You There" "Panic"
Jux	"God Design" "Ololufe Mi"
Nasboi	"Umbrella"
Magnito	"Canada"

== Winners and nominees ==
Below is the list of winners and nominees for the popular music categories, which were reviewed between 1 April 2023 and 31 July 2024.

Song of the Year	Afrobeats Single of the Year
"Lonely at the Top" – Asake; "Showa" – Kizz Daniel; "Commas" – Ayra Starr; "Egwu" – Chike & MohBad; "Ozeba" – Rema; "Big Baller" – Flavour	"Big Baller" – Flavour; "Big Big Things" – Young Jonn (featuring Kizz Daniel and Seyi Vibez); "Twe Twe (Remix)" – Kizz Daniel (featuring Davido); "Egwu" – Chike & MohBad; "Remember" – Asake; "Ogechi (Remix)" – Hyce, BoyPee , & Brown Joel (featuring Davido)
Album of the Year	Afrobeats Album of the Year
Heis – Rema; Born in the Wild – Tems; The Year I Turned 21 – Ayra Starr; Stubborn – Victony; Work of Art – Asake	Heis – Rema; Stubborn – Victony; Work of Art – Asake; The Year I Turned 21 – Ayra Starr; Jiggy Forever – Young Jonn
Best Recording of the Year	Best Collaboration
"Burning" – Tems; "Different Pattern" – Seyi Vibez; "Higher" – Burna Boy; "Last Heartbreak Song" – Ayra Starr (featuring Giveon); "Billions" – Sarz (featuring Lojay}	"Egwu" – Chike & MohBad; "Emotions" – Tiwa Savage (featuring Aṣa); "Blood on the Dance Floor" – Odumodublvck (featuring Bloody Civilian and Wale); "Cast" – Shallipopi (featuring Odumodublvck); "Ole" – Qing Madi (featuring Bnxn); "Twe Twe (Remix)" – Kizz Daniel (featuring Davido); "IDK" – Wizkid (featuring Zlatan)
Best Rap Album	Best Rap Single
Family Time – Erigga; Sideh Kai – Illbliss; Eziokwu – Odumodublvck; ATSG, Vol. 1 – Reminisce; Shiny Object Syndrome – Mode 9	"Cast" – Shallipopi (featuring Odumodublvck}; "Blood on the Dance Floor" – Odumodublvck (featuring Bloody Civilian and Wale}; "Hallelujah" – Ladipoe (featuring Rozzz and Morrelo); "Canada" – Magnito; "Ije Nwoke" – Jeriq
Best R&B Single	Best Street-Hop Artiste
Chimamanda Pearl Chukwuma – "Vision" by Qing Madi; Simisola Kosoko – "Stranger" by Simi; Michael Ajuma Attah – "Can't Breathe" by Llona; Emoseh Khamofu – "Family Meeting" by Bloody Civilian; Fuayefika Maxwell – "Stages of Life" by Wizard Chan	MohBad – "Ask About Me"; Seyi Vibez – "Different Pattern"; Ayo Maff – "Dealer" (featuring Fireboy DML); Shallipopi – "Cast" (featuring Odumodublvck); Zhus Jdo – "Johnbull"
Best Vocal Performance (Female)	Best Vocal Performance (Male)
Liya – "I'm Done"; Ayra Starr (featuring Giveon) – "Last Heartbreak Song"; Niniola – "Level"; Simi – "Stranger"; Yemi Alade – "Tomorrow"	Lojay – "Billions"; Omah Lay – "Moving"; Anendlessocean – "Gratitude"; Johnny Drille – "For You"; Timi Dakolo – "Ke Na Ke So"
Artiste of the Year	Next Rated
Davido; Ayra Starr; Asake; Rema; Tems; Burna Boy	Odumodublvck; Qing Madi; Shallipopi; Ayo Maff; Nasboi
Best Performer (Live)	Music Video of the Year (Note: This particular accolade is awarded to the video director.)
Burna Boy; Rema; Omah Lay; Flavour; Wizard Chan; Femi Kuti & the Positive Force	"Egwu" – Chike & MohBad; "Emotions" – Tiwa Savage (featuring Aṣa); "Blood on the Dance Floor" – Odumodublvck (featuring Bloody Civilian and Wale); "Cast" – Shallipopi (featuring Odumodublvck); "Ole" – Qing Madi (featuring Bnxn); "Twe Twe (Remix)" – Kizz Daniel (featuring Davido); "IDK" – Wizkid (featuring Zlatan)
Producer of the Year	Songwriter of the Year
London – "Ozeba"; Sarz – "Happiness"; Magicsticks – "Basquiat"; Rema, Producer X, Cubeatz, Deatz, Klimperboy – "Hehehe"; Dibs – "Different Pattern"	Chimamanda Pearl Chukwuma – "Vision" by Qing Madi; Simisola Kosoko – "Stranger" by Simi; Michael Ajuma Attah – "Can't Breathe" by Llona; Emoseh Khamofu – "Family Meeting" by Bloody Civilian; Fuayefika Maxwell – "Stages of Life" by Wizard Chan
Lyricist on the Roll	Headies Viewers' Choice
Ladipoe – "Hallelujah"; A-Q – "Mogadishu"; M.I Abaga – "Chocolate City Cypher"; Blaqbonez – "Chocolate City Cypher"; Alpha Ojini – "Efeleme"	"Egwu" – Chike & MohBad; "Big Big Things" – Young Jonn (featuring Kizz Daniel and Seyi Vibez); "Ogechi (Remix)" – Hyce, BoyPee, & Brown Joel (featuring Davido); "Showa" – Kizz Daniel; "Different Pattern" – Seyi Vibez; "Ozeba" – Rema; "Love Me JeJe" – Tems; "Cast" – Shallipopi (featuring Odumodublvck); "Dealer" – Ayo Maff (featuring Fireboy DML); "Big Baller" – Flavour
Digital Artiste of the Year	Rookie of the Year
Davido; Ayra Starr; Rema; Shallipopi; Tems; Kizz Daniel; Asake	Zerrydl; Taves; Kaestyle; Llona
International Artiste of the Year	Best West African Artiste of the Year
Travis Scott – "Active" (with Asake); Wale – "Blood on the Dance Floor" (with Odumodublvck and Bloody Civilian); Skepta – "Tony Montana" (featuring Portable); Chris Brown – "Hmmm" (featuring Davido); Chlöe – "Vision" (Remix) (with Qing Madi)	Himra (Ivory Coast); Black Sherif (Ghana); King Promise (Ghana); Josey (Ivory Coast); Toofan (Togo)
Best East African Artiste of the Year	Best North African Artiste of the Year
Juma Jux (Tanzania); Bien (Kenya); Diamond Platnumz (Tanzania); Bruce Melodie (Rwanda); Azawi (Uganda)	Soolking (Algeria); Mohamed Ramadan (Egypt); ElGrandeToto (Morocco); Balti (Tunisia); Abu (Egypt)
Best Southern African Artiste of the Year	Best Central African Artiste of the Year
TitoM (South Africa); Yuppe (South Africa); Tyla (South Africa); Kelly Kay (Malawi); Plutonio (Mozambique); Zee Nxumalo (South Africa)	Innoss'B (Democratic Republic of the Congo); Gaz Mawete (Democratic Republic of the Congo); Emma'a (Gabon); Eboloko (Gabon); Singuila (Central African Republic); Kocee (Cameroon)
Best Inspirational Single	Soundtrack of the Year
"You Do This One" – Mercy Chinwo; "Gratitude" – Anendlessocean; "Worthy of My Praise" – Dunsin Oyekan (featuring Lawrence Oyor); "Good God 2" – Limoblaze (featuring Naomi Raine); "Particularly" – Gaise Baba (featuring Tope Alabi)	"Tribe Called Judah Soundtrack" – Tolu Obanro & Abbey Wonder (A Tribe Called Judah); "Eledumare" - Teledalese (Anikulapo: Rise of the Spectre); "Lose to Gain" - Kaline (Breath of Life); "Kill Boro" – Native Filmworks & Wizard Chan (Kill Boro); "Orisa" – Beriola (Orisa); "Emotions" – Tiwa Savage & Aṣa (Water & Garri)
Special Recognition
KCee
