= Adeola =

- Gender: Male or female
- Language: Yoruba

Origin
- Origin: Nigeria
- Meaning: the crown or royalty of prestige and wealth
- Region of origin: Southwestern Nigeria

Other names
- Variant form: Modadeola

Adéọlá audiois both a Yoruba surname and a given name meaning "the crown or royalty of prestige and wealth". Notable people with the name include:

== Surname ==
- Aderonke Adeola, Nigerian film director, art historian, fashion entrepreneur, script-writer and producer
- Fola Adeola (born 1954), Nigerian civil servant
- Ogechi Adeola, Nigerian business academic

== Given name ==
- Adeola Ajayi, Nigerian intelligence officer
- Adeola Fayehun (born 1984), Nigerian journalist
- Adeola Odutola (1902–1995), Nigerian businessman
- Adeola Lanre Runsewe (born 1989), Nigerian footballer
- Adeola Soyemi, Nigerian singer with Les Amazones d'Afrique
