= John L. Hanson Jr. =

American deejay and radio host (born circa 1950)

John L. Hanson Jr. (born circa 1950) is an American radio broadcaster, disc jockey, and interviewer. He is the longtime host and producer of In Black America, a nationally syndicated public radio program focusing on the African American experience. Hanson has interviewed prominent figures in politics, civil rights, music, literature, sports, and culture and has also worked as a DJ on KUT and KUTX.

== Early life and education ==
John L. Hanson Jr. was born in Detroit, Michigan and grew up in a household where music was played regularly on the radio, including gospel, soul, western and rock and roll. His father was a musician who played the trumpet which Hanson also learned to play. During his first year of football in high school, he would play with the school band at halftime while still wearing his football uniform. Hanson was also a track athlete.

Hanson started in radio as a music programmer and youth reporter at his high school in Detroit. He also had a part-time position playing records on an afternoon radio show during the summer.

Following high school graduation in Detroit, Hanson received a track-and-field scholarship from Huston-Tillotson University. He moved to Austin in 1970, where he studied accounting and economics. While attending Huston-Tillotson University, he hosted a popular daytime program of jazz and soul music at KHRB, a small, low-wattage station in nearby Lockhart, Texas.

== KUT and Soul on FM ==
He was hired by KUT in 1974 and his first assignment was producing the nightly music program Soul on FM. The show became an "immediate success" according to a 2025 KUT article.

In 1977, Hanson received a Minority Training Grant from the Corporation for Public Broadcasting and attended their workshops. After returning from the training he sought to improve and expand coverage of Austin's Black community, believing local media outlets were doing an inadequate job. Using his new training he established Access, a weekly public affairs program consisting of a live call-in program. The KUT program allowed experts in various fields to share their knowledge about potential impacts on the Austin community with the public.

In 1980 KUT management cancelled Soul on FM because of the expected arrival of KAZI, a new community radio station that would soon serve the Austin African American community.

In 1980 he began working on the In Black America show, KUT's nationally syndicated program dedicated to the African American experience.

He has served in several positions at KUT, including interim general manager on two occasions. He retired from KUT in 2011.

His career has allowed him to combine interviewing people and playing records, which he describes as an enjoyable combination.

== In Black America ==
KUT management approached Hanson about producing and hosting In Black America after the cancellation of Soul on FM. The show features interviews concerning issues affecting African Americans, including education, social issues, economics, families, sports, culture, literature and politics.

KUT Management suggested their nationally syndicated program would enable him to reach a national audience, addressing issues facing African Americans while also celebrating their accomplishments. Management believed he would have a broader impact than the local music program. Hanson became the host and producer of the show, which was heard weekly on 12 radio stations across the country.

When taking over In Black America, Hanson requested a travel budget so that he could interview people from outside Austin and expand the program to reflect Black America beyond the local Austin community.

His first interview after becoming host of In Black America was with Yolanda King, the daughter of Martin Luther King Jr. During over 45 years hosting, Hanson has interviewed hundreds of people, including Maya Angelou, John Lewis, Aretha Franklin, Lena Horne, Andrew Young, Joseph Lowery, Coretta Scott King, Bill Cosby, Arthur Ashe, Maulana Karenga, Les Payne and Joe Sample.

Hanson has said he prepares extensively for interviews, reading widely and trying to gather as much information as possible before an interview. He conducts interviews from the perspective of the audience and asks questions an average listener might ask.

Hanson has summarized his philosophy for In Black America as "My mantra is to educate and be educated". He has said that the program seeks to broaden understanding of the African American experience and provide a voice for people and communities he believes are sometimes overlooked by mainstream media.

During the COVID-19 pandemic and accompanying civil unrest, Hanson intended for In Black America to focus on how those events affected African Americans and on the responses of government and business leaders.

According to a 2025 KUTX profile, he had hosted the program for 45 years. In discussing the program's legacy, Hanson said he hoped listeners would gain knowledge and come away believing that achievement was possible despite obstacles.

A 2020 KXAN story described Hanson as a "trusted voice" in the African American community and beyond, referring to his distinctive place on Austin radio as both an interviewer and disc jockey. A 2025 Texas Standard profile characterized Hanson as "a legend and pioneer in radio and media" and listed some of his interviews with prominent people.

Although he retired from KUT in 2011, he has continued producing and hosting In Black America.

== KUTX and Old School Dance Party ==
Once a week Hanson deejays The Old School Dance Party, where he takes on the persona of a fun-loving disc jockey and calls himself "John E. Dee", (sometimes spelled "Jon E. Dee").

He began hosting the three hour music program on KUTX in February 2013, a month after KUT spun off its music-centric division to KUTX. It had been 33 years since he'd deejayed on Soul on FM.

Hanson has said that he brings his own CDs to the studio and scripts the first six songs before allowing the remainder of the program to flow.

He continues to host The Old School Dance Party broadcast every Friday afternoon from 4 p.m. until 7 p.m. on KUTX.

== Personal life ==
Hanson married Latischa M. Merritt and has two children, Kacey and Michael.

== Awards and recognition ==
Hanson's awards include:

- "Best DJ in Texas" by Texas Monthly magazine in 1976
- Living Legends Award from The Villager
- Presidential Excellence Award from University of Texas at Austin
