= Kendickson =

Nigerian musician

- Born: 10 December 1996 (age 29); Enugu State
- Occupation: Musician
- Years active: 2015-present
- Website: https://iamkendickson.com/

Amu Kingsley Chibuike (born 10 December 1996), also known as Kendickson, is a Nigerian music artist, songwriter, and content creator based in Lagos, Nigeria.

== Early life ==
Kendickson is a Nigerian Afropop singer and songwriter. Born on December 10, 1996, he officially entered the music industry in 2017 with his single "Over" but gained significant recognition in 2019 following the release of his hit track "Jojo".

== Musical career ==
Career Highlights

- Musical Style: He is known for blending Afrobeat, pop, and soul music, citing influences such as Fela Kuti, Michael Jackson, and Bob Marley.
- Recent Releases:
  - "God's Plan" (January 2026).
  - "Exotic (Isakaba)" (November 2025).
  - "Nobody (Akonuche)" featuring Wizard Chan (June 2025).
  - "Remind Me" (April 2025).
- Notable Awards: He has been recognized by the City People Music Awards, winning both "Best New Act of the Year" and "Revelation of the Year".

Popular Songs & Discography

- EPs: Love Series (2023).
- Top Singles:
  - "Jojo"
  - "Wayo"
  - "Lole"
  - "Oringo"
  - "Blessings"

He has a social media account on Instagram (@iamkendickson) and his music is available on platforms Apple Music and Deezer.

Kendickson has been active since 2017, consistently releasing singles and expanding his sound into genres like Amapiano. His latest music features a mix of soulful Afropop and high-energy dance tracks.

Recent Discography (2023–2026)

His most recent major project is the Love Series EP, released in January 2023.

- God’s Plan (Single, 2026)
- Exotic (Isakaba) (Single, 2025)
- Nobody (Akonuche) (Single, 2025)
- Remind Me (Single, 2025)
- Oringo (Single, 2024)
- Enjoyment (Single, 2023)
- Love Series (EP, 2023) – Features tracks like "Slow," "Keyholder," "Temperature," and "Reach".

Notable Collaborations

While many of his hits are solo efforts, Kendickson has worked with other rising stars to blend different sounds:

- Wizard Chan: Featured on the 2025 hit single "Nobody (Akonuche)".
- Wayo (Amapiano Remix): A 2020 reimagining of his earlier hit, leaning into the popular South African genre.

Career Milestones

- Early Success: His breakout singles "Jojo" (2019) and "Wayo" (2020) garnered millions of streams and established his presence in the Afrobeats scene.
- Viral Hits: The song "Ride or Die" (2022) became a viral sensation, further solidifying his fan base.
- Chart Recognition: He has been highlighted as an artist to watch in 2026 by various African music publications.
