= Aderonke =

- Gender: Female
- Language: Yoruba

Origin
- Origin: Nigeria
- Meaning: the crown or royalty has found something to cherish
- Region of origin: South West Nigeria

pronunciation

Adérónkẹ́ is a feminine Yoruba name and surname meaning "the crown or royalty has found something to cherish".

== Notable people with that name include ==
- Aderonke Adeola, Nigerian film director
- Aderonke Apata (born 1967), Nigerian LGBT activist and former asylum seeker
- Aderonke Kale, Nigerian army psychiatrist
