= Ogechi =

Ogechi // is a feminine given name of Igbo that means 'chi's time'. Ogechukwu is also used.

- Ogechi Adeola, Nigerian business academic
- Paola Ogechi Egonu (born 1998), Italian volleyball player
- Ogechi Ogwudu, Nigerian taekwondo practitioner
- Ogechi Onyinanya (born 1985), Nigerian footballer

== See also ==
- Fredrick Ogechi Okwara (born 1989), Nigerian footballer
