= KXBT =

KXBT may refer to:

- KXBT (FM), a radio station (88.1 FM) licensed to serve Somerville, Texas, United States
- KDYA, a radio station (1190 AM) licensed to serve Vallejo, California, United States, which held the call sign KXBT from 1993 to 1998
- KUTX, a radio station (98.9 FM) licensed to serve Leander, Texas, United States, which held the call sign KXBT from 2009 to 2013
