= BoyPee =

Nigerian singer and songwriter

- Also known as: SPee; S-Pee
- Born: Sopuruchukwu Precious Odunze; 22 August 1997 (age 29); Imo State, Nigeria
- Origin: Onitsha, Anambra State, Nigeria
- Genres: Afro-soul; Afropop
- Occupations: Singer; songwriter
- Years active: 2017–present
- Labels: Sony Music, Choko Music

Sopuruchukwu Precious Odunze, known professionally as BoyPee, is a Nigerian Afro-soul and Afropop singer and songwriter. In 2024, he released the single "Ogechi" with Hyce and Brown Joel; the song reached number four on the TurnTable Top 100. A remix featuring Davido reached number one on the same chart and was certified 4× Platinum by TurnTable Charts. The remix was also nominated at the 17th Headies Awards.

== Early life ==
Precious was born in Imo State, Nigeria. He grew up in Onitsha, Anambra State, where he completed his primary and secondary education. In 2010, he began performing locally as a dancer. He switched to singing and songwriting in 2017. He initially performed Igbo rap under the stage name SPee (or S-Pee). During this period, he was influenced by Phyno and local highlife records.

== Career ==
Precious first built an online following by posting freestyles and song covers on Instagram. In 2022, he signed with Big G Entertainment and changed his stage name to BoyPee, short for "Boy Precious". Later that year, he released the solo single "Mi Amor". In 2023, he released a remix of "Mi Amor" featuring Phyno, followed by "Osondi Owendi (Remix)" with Kolaboy.

In May 2024, BoyPee released the single "Ogechi" with Hyce and Brown Joel. The song gained popularity on TikTok and streaming services and peaked at number four on the TurnTable Top 100. It was the first top-ten entry on the chart for all three artists.

After the song gained attention online, Cubana Chief Priest introduced it to Davido, who recorded a verse for a remix.

The "Ogechi" remix was released on 25 June 2024, the day of Davido's wedding in Lagos. It entered the TurnTable Top 100 top ten and reached number one on 15 July 2024. The remix was certified 4× Platinum by TurnTable Charts. At the 17th Headies Awards, it was nominated for Afrobeats Single of the Year and Headies Viewer's Choice.

In August 2024, BoyPee, Hyce, and Brown Joel released the single "Constantly", which peaked at number 24 on the TurnTable Top 100 and number 48 on the Apple Music Nigeria Top 100. Later that year, BoyPee performed alongside Davido at the Flytime Music Festival in Lagos. He also made a guest appearance on Big Brother Naija.

Alongside the trio's collaborative releases, BoyPee issued solo singles including "First Sight" and "Choice" (2025), and collaborated with Duncan Mighty and Rord Kelly. He also featured alongside Zoro on Cubana Chief Priest's single "Summer Adina", which received a Best Alternative Song nomination at the 18th Headies Awards.

In 2026, BoyPee toured five cities in the United Kingdom: London, Manchester, Birmingham, Bristol, and Sheffield. That year, he also performed with Flavour at indigo at The O2 in London. On 28 August 2026, he released the single "For You", produced by Izzybeatzz and co-produced by Elvees Beats. Later that year, he released "One Round" with Premium EMF through his latest singing with Sony Music Entertainment West Africa.

== Discography ==
=== Extended plays ===
Title	EP details	Ref.
Synergy (with Hyce and Brown Joel)	Released: 2025; Format: Digital download, streaming	

=== Singles ===
==== As lead artist ====
Title	Year	Peak chart positions NG	Certifications	Album
"Mi Amor"	2022	—		Non-album singles
"Mi Amor (Remix)" (featuring Phyno)	2023	—		Non-album singles
"Osondi Owendi (Remix)" (with Kolaboy)	2023	—		Non-album singles
"Ogechi" (with Hyce and Brown Joel)	2024	4		Synergy
"Ogechi (Remix)" (with Hyce and Brown Joel featuring Davido)	2024	1	TCS: 4× Platinum	Synergy
"Constantly" (with Hyce and Brown Joel)	2024	24		Synergy
"Choice"	2025	—		Non-album singles
"For You"	2026	—		Non-album singles
"One Round" (with Premium EMF)	2026	—		Non-album singles

==== As featured artist ====
Title	Year	Album	Ref.
"Summer Adina" (Cubana Chief Priest featuring BoyPee and Zoro)	2025	Non-album single	

== Awards and nominations ==
Year	Award	Category	Nominated work	Result	Ref.
2025	17th Headies Awards	Afrobeats Single of the Year	"Ogechi (Remix)" (with Hyce, Brown Joel, and Davido)	Nominated	
2025	17th Headies Awards	Headies Viewer's Choice	"Ogechi (Remix)" (with Hyce, Brown Joel, and Davido)	Nominated	
2024	TikTok Awards Sub-Saharan Africa	Breakthrough Artist of the Year	Himself	Won	
2027	18th Headies Awards	Best Alternative Song	"Summer Adina" (with Cubana Chief Priest and Zoro)	Nominated	
