= Worldbeat =

Music genre

- Stylistic origins: World music; rock; pop; traditional music
- Cultural origins: Mid-1980s, UK, US, West Africa

Worldbeat is a music genre that blends pop music or rock music with world music or traditional music. Worldbeat is similar to other cross-pollination labels of contemporary and roots genres, and which suggest a rhythmic, harmonic or textural contrast and synthesis between its modern and ethnic elements.

== Definition ==
Worldbeat is akin to world fusion and global fusion, each of which primarily manifest as a blend of non-Western music tradition and Western, popular music. These particular music genres can also reflect in a cross-blend of more than one "traditional" flavor, producing innovative, hybrid expressions of world music. As with most "world"-laden genre categories, worldbeat is not clearly defined as are the many classic world music subgenres, such as gamelan, or calypso. In general, the expanding family of ethnic music subgenres under the world music umbrella represents an intrinsically nebulous terminology, which depending on how one interprets a particular hybrid of world music, can be interchangeable to a significant degree. Worldbeat defines a hybrid of what can be listed under the generalized world music term, even though it features a prominent interbreeding with elements of Western, pop music.

As an ethnically coloured genre, worldbeat is a part of the world music movement that is steadily influencing popular music in every corner of the globe. This is partially due to the advance of digital music production and the availability of high-quality ethnic music samples to artists and producers in the recording arts. The globalization of texture and style between indigenous and modern music genres has rapidly expanded the scope of 21st century popular music, and continues to reshape how the world defines the increasing number of genres conceived with world music elements.

=== Distinction relative to world music ===
Worldbeat, world fusion and global fusion are hybrid genres that have evolved under the world music genre. Their most prominent feature is an obvious meld between pop and indigenous culture, which often causes them to be indistinguishable from one another.

Contemporary genre hybrids with world music elements naturally proliferate in proportion to the globalization of music culture. In music catalogs, hybrid genres are often only given the database choice of "world", thus the perception of what can define world music has evolved to include pop influences.

There is disagreement whether all pop and traditional music hybrids exhibiting prominent ethno-influences, such as worldbeat, belong under the world music umbrella.

=== Similar terminology ===
Music genre terms that contain "world" are commonly subject to a very ambiguous consumer definition, due to the confusing similarity and overlapping interpretation of these categories. The world music category is inherently diverse, and offers wide possibilities for application in hybrid form, especially in mainstream, market-driven music. Worldbeat as a small subgenre of popular music has a mounting consumer-perception as a hybrid subgenre of world music, to the chagrin of world music purists. In its context as a liberally termed subgenre under the world music umbrella, worldbeat is very similar to world fusion and global fusion. The distinctions that delineate these hybrid, "world" terms are slight, and in many ways they are still being defined.

== History ==
In the mid-1980s, eclectic musician Dan Del Santo hosted a "World Beat" show for the Austin, Texas radio station KUT that popularized the term. Mainstream artists were incorporating world music influences into their sound and popularizing the "world" term at the time, notably David Byrne, Peter Gabriel (who launched in 1982 the renowned and still running WOMAD Festival (World Of Music Art and Dance) and Paul Simon. A number of worldbeat pioneers in the 1980s were from West Africa, including Mory Kante, Salif Keita, King Sunny Ade and Youssou N'Dour.

Initially, the most prominent influences came from Africa, Asia, South America (especially Brazil), the Middle East and Central America, though now encompass an ever-widening range of ethnic diversity. It has remained a thriving subgenre of popular and world music, while continuing to influence new artists, especially those appearing on today's growing roster of indie record labels (artist examples cited in section 2 of this article). Some of worldbeat's most successfully integrated folk elements include bossa nova, reggae, Afrobeat, mbaqanga, qawwali, highlife, rai, raga, Samba, flamenco and tango.

== See also ==
- Afro fusion
- Ambient music
- New-age music
- Folk music
- Exotica
