= Graduate School of Journalism =

Graduate School of Journalism may refer to:

- Columbia University Graduate School of Journalism
- Craig Newmark Graduate School of Journalism at the City University of New York
- UC Berkeley Graduate School of Journalism
