= Maria Martin (journalist) =

Mexican-American journalist (1951–2023)

- Born: María Emilia Martin; January 28, 1951; Mexico City, Mexico
- Died: December 2, 2023 (aged 72); Austin, Texas, US
- Citizenship: Mexico; United States
- Education: University of Portland; Sonoma State University
- Alma mater: University of Texas at Austin (BA); Ohio State University (MS)
- Occupation: Journalist
- Years active: 1975–2023
- Known for: Latino and Latin American journalism
- Notable work: Latino USA

María Emilia Martin (January 28, 1951 – December 2, 2023) was a Mexican-born American journalist who primarily focused on Latin American and Latino affairs. After working for National Public Radio (NPR), she founded Latino USA, a radio program focused on Latino American culture, issues, and history.

== Early life and education ==
Martin was born in Mexico City on January 28, 1951, and was of Mexican and Irish descent. She grew up in California.

She attended the University of Portland in Oregon, and Sonoma State University in California but did not graduate from either school. Martin obtained her bachelor's degree at the University of Texas, later attending Ohio State University, where she earned a master's degree in journalism in 1999.

== Career ==
In 1975, Martin first became involved in radio after KBBF, a bilingual radio station in Santa Rosa, California, invited a Chicana group she was a member of, Mujeres por la Raza, to host a weekly show on Friday nights. The weekly show, Somos Chicanas, saw Martin doing her first journalistic work as she produced the show as a volunteer. In doing so, she also became the station's first Latina director.

After leaving KBBF, Martin founded California En Revista, a Spanish-language radio news magazine, and worked for the Latin American News Service in El Paso, Texas as an editor.

Martin joined NPR, where she was an editor on their national program, Latin File. Later, she became NPR's first Latin American affairs editor on the national desk. During her time there, she covered the Nicaraguan Revolution in the 1980s and covered the California State Legislature in the 1970s and 1980s.

Martin left NPR in 1992, and subsequently co-founded Latino USA, an English-language radio program based out of the University of Texas with support from the Ford Foundation. Martin also chose Maria Hinojosa as the show's host. Martin remained with the show as a producer until 2003.

Martin moved to Antigua Guatemala, Guatemala in 2003, where she founded the GraciasVida Center for Media. There, she also produced Después de las Guerras: Central America After the Wars, a 26-part bilingual radio program about the aftermath of the wars in Central America in the 1980s and 1990s.

Martin trained journalists in the Central American countries of Bolivia, Guatemala, and Nicaragua, as well as in Kyrgyzstan, Mexico, Uruguay, and the United States. In San Antonio, Texas, she taught a class at the Esperanza Peace and Justice Center on community radio production.

In 2020, she published a memoir entitled Crossing Borders, Building Bridges: A Journalist's Heart in Latin America. She reported on Guatemala for NBC News, and continued to contribute to NPR reports on Guatemalan issues through 2023.

== Recognition ==
In 1998, Martin received the Best Voice On The Radio award from The Austin Chronicle's Best of Austin awards.

In 2000, Martin won the Unda-USA Gabriel Award and a Robert F. Kennedy Journalism Award for her story, "Who Were the Torturers? The Betrayal of Sister Dianna Ortiz," which aired on Latino USA in November 1999.

In September 2015, Martin was inducted into the National Association of Hispanic Journalists Hall of Fame. At the time of her death, Martin was a journalist fellow for the University of South Carolina's Center for Religion and Civic Culture.

== Death and legacy ==
In 2023, Martin struggled with health issues. She died at age 72 in Austin, Texas, on December 2, 2023, following an operation.

Her personal papers were donated to the Nettie Lee Benson Latin American Collection at the University of Texas at Austin.
