= Qing Madi (EP) =

EP by Qing Madi

EP by Qing Madi
- Released: 17 November 2023
- Recorded: 2023
- Genre: Afrobeats; neo soul; soul; afropop
- Length: 19:00
- Label: Jton Music
- Producer: Ktizo; Wademix; Ozedikus; PD; EchoTheGuru; Big Fish; Ramoni; Saszy (deluxe edition); AYObasically (deluxe edition)

Singles from Qing Madi
- 1. "See Finish" Released: 14 October 2022; 2. "Why" Released: 24 May 2023; 3. "Ole" Released: 21 July 2023

Qing Madi is the self-titled debut extended play by Nigerian singer-songwriter Qing Madi, released on November 17, 2023, by Jton Music. The EP received generally favorable reviews from critics and peaked at number 14 on the Nigeria Apple Music chart. Qing Madi spawned the hit song "Ole", which charted at number 12 on the TurnTable Top 100.

== Background and release ==
Madi's music career gained momentum in 2022 with the release of her breakout single "See Finish," which went viral on TikTok. Building on her newfound popularity, she collaborated with Bnxn on the hit single "Ole" in 2023. Later that year, she unveiled the music video for "Ole," directed by Director Pink. On November 10, Madi announced the release of her EP, which debuted on November 17, 2023. In July 2024, she dropped the deluxe edition of the EP, featuring a remix of "Vision" with Chloe Bailey, as well as new tracks "YBIL (You Believe in Love)" with Kizz Daniel and "Sins For U."

== Composition ==
The 7-track EP, features a diverse range of songs. The first track, "Madi's Medley", is an Afrobeat song with melodic tunes that showcase Qing Madi's strength and resilience in protecting herself from enemies. The second track, "Ole", is a Contemporary song that features Madi and Bnxn exchanging messages of pride through the lyrics. The third track, "Vision", is an Afrobeats song where Madi sings about her future aspirations and vision.The fourth track, "American Love", is a Love song addressed to a love interest, affirming her love and embracing the world. The fifth track, "Chargie", is an Afropop song that highlights her struggles with fame and the efforts of enemies trying to bring her down. The sixth track, "Why", is a pop song that explores people's curiosity about her life and way of living. Finally, the last track, "See Finish", is a Nigeria R&B and Afropop song that addresses how people criticize her and her approach to staying clear of negativity and avoiding trouble.

== Critical reception ==
Professional ratings
Review scores
Source	Rating
Pulse Nigeria	7.5/10

Adeayo Adebiyi of Pulse Nigeria rated the extended play 7.5/10, praising Qing Madi's impressive talent, evident throughout her EP. With notable vocal ability and songwriting skills, Adebiyi suggests Madi's next step is refining her craft to appeal beyond a niche teenage audience. The EP excels in cohesion, boasting well-produced tracks, impressive vocals, and Western-inspired melodies, all complemented by thoughtful lyrics.

== Track listing ==
Qing Madi track listing
No.	Title	Writer(s)	Producer(s)	Length
1.	"Madi' Medley"	Chimamanda Pearl Chukwuma	Ktizo	2:38
2.	"Ole"	Chukwuma; Daniel Benson	0zedikus	2:50
3.	"Vision"	Chukwuma	Jton	2:26
4.	"American Love"	Chukwuma	Ramoni	3:09
5.	"Chargie"	Chukwuma	Jton	2:32
6.	"Why"	Chukwuma	Big Fish	2:45
7.	"See Finish"	Chukwuma	Ramoni	3:00
Total length:				19:00

== Release history ==
Region	Date	Format	Version	Label
Various	17 November 2023	streaming, digital download, CD	Standard	JTON Music
