= NYCity News Service =

New York news wire service

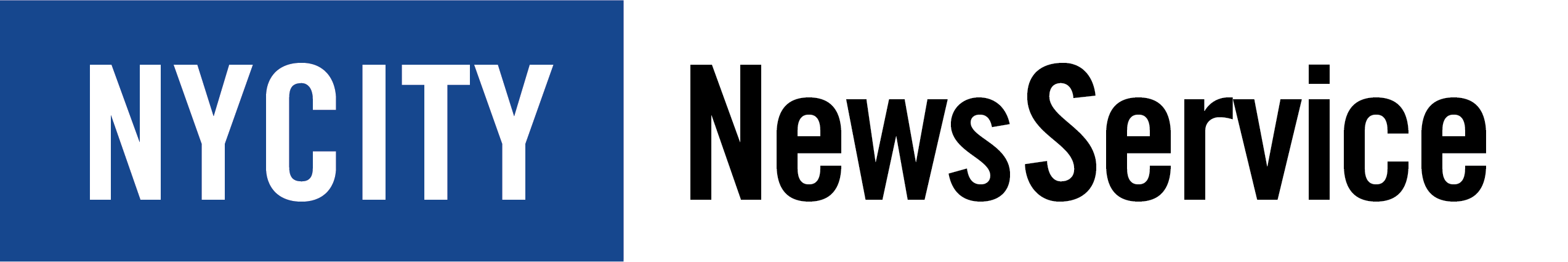
- Website type: News
- Available in: English
- Headquarters: Craig Newmark Graduate School of Journalism at the City University of New York, {{{location_country}}}
- Creator: Jere Hester
- Website: nycitynewsservice.com
- Launched: January 2007
- Current status: Active

The NYCity News Service is an online news wire service run by the Craig Newmark Graduate School of Journalism at the City University of New York. Graduate students report news about New York City and, with supervision from the university's faculty, publish the stories digitally for possible syndication by external publications. The service focuses on local news stories and has fed content to local publications such as the New York Daily News and the Park Slope Courier.

CUNY announced the appointment of Jere Hester, the former City Editor of the Daily News, as News Service Director on November 13, 2006. The first post was made to NYCity News Service's website on January 12, 2007 , although it had been feeding stories to the Daily News since December 11, 2006.

NYCity News Service does not charge for its content, which is made available to news organizations on a first-come, first-served basis. However, attribution credit is required to acknowledge the students' work.
