= Latino USA =

American radio program

- Genre: Podcast
- Running time: 54 min.
- Country of origin: United States
- Language(s): English
- Syndicates: PRX
- Hosted by: Maria Hinojosa
- Original release: 1992
- Website: latinousa.org
- Podcast: www.npr.org

Latino USA is a nationally syndicated public radio program and podcast produced by The Futuro Media Group and distributed nationwide by the Public Radio Exchange (PRX), after 27 years of being distributed by NPR. The program is anchored by Maria Hinojosa.

== History ==
According to founding Executive Producer Maria Emilia Martin, Latino USA was born following several failed attempts by NPR to create Latino-oriented programming for public radio. The program originated at KUT in Austin, Texas. KUT approached the Center for Mexican-American Studies at the University of Texas at Austin for a partnership in the production of the series. Dr. Gil Cardenas, director of the Center for Mexican-American Studies, co-wrote a grant proposal with KUT-FM to the Corporation for Public Broadcasting (CPB) that eventually led to the creation of Latino USA, which premiered in April 1993. Originally launched by University of Texas in Austin and the Ford Foundation in 1992, it was a cutting-edge experiment to create an English-language Latino-centered public radio program. In 1992, Maria Emilia Martin left her position as editor at NPR in Washington, D.C. to become Latino USA's founding Executive Producer. She brought Maria Hinojosa on board as the program anchor, a post she still holds.

In 2000, responsibility for the administration of Latino USA was transferred from the Center for Mexican American Studies at the University of Texas at Austin, to KUT-FM, based at UT's College of Communication. In 2002, Maria Emilia Martin left her position as Executive Producer and was replaced by Hinojosa. In 2006, Hinojosa had the title "Managing Editor" added.

In 2010, Futuro Media Group, a production company founded by Hinojosa, assumed full developmental and production responsibilities for Latino USA, including content, research and reporting. In 2012, the show transitioned from its half-hour format to its current one-hour format, overseen in turn by senior producers Carolina González, A.C. Valdez, and Daisy Rosario.

== Today ==
Today, Latino USA is a public radio show with a dedicated focus on America's Latino community. It is the longest-running Latino-focused program on the radio. It is ranked among the top ten in five of the top 25 national markets.

== Awards ==
In April 2015, Latino USA earned a Peabody Award for "Gangs, Murder, and Migration in Honduras," a 2014 documentary which detailed the motivation behind the migration of thousands seeking to escape the violence of Honduras for a life in the United States.

== See also ==
- Institute for Nonprofit News (Futuro Media is a member)
