= In Black America =

Nationally syndicated audio program

- Country of origin: United States
- Language: English
- Home station: KUT
- Recording studio: Austin, Texas
- Original release: September, 1970 – present
- Audio format: Stereo
- Podcast: Podcast

Produced at KUT, In Black America is a long-running, nationally syndicated program dedicated to all facets of the African American experience. John L. Hanson Jr. profiles a diverse selection of current and historically significant figures whose stories help illuminate life in Black America. Guests include civil rights leaders, educators, artists, athletes and writers describing their experiences, achievements and work in chronicling and advancing the quality of African American life.

In 2019 KUT in collaboration with the American Archive of Public Broadcasting were awarded a Recordings at Risk CLIR grant to digitize, preserve, and provide access to In Black America. Access to the episodes is made available through the American Archive of Public Broadcasting, KUT, and the Briscoe Center for American History.
