= Vision (Qing Madi song) =

2023 single by Qing Madi

Song by Qing Madi

from the EP Qing Madi
- Released: October 27, 2023
- Recorded: 2023
- Genre: Afrobeats
- Length: 2:26
- Label: Bu Vision
- Songwriters: Pearl Chukwuma; Divine Precious; Oghenejabor Wade
- Producer: PD

Lyrical video
- "Vision" on YouTube

"Vision"

Single by Qing Madi and Chlöe
- Released: May 3, 2024
- Recorded: 2024
- Genre: Afrobeats
- Length: 2:46
- Label: JTon Music; Bu Vision
- Songwriters: Pearl Chukwuma; Chloe Bailey; Divine Precious; Oghenejabor Wade
- Producer: PD

Chlöe singles chronology
"FYS" (2024)	"Vision" (2024)	"Boy Bye" (2024)

Music video
- "Vision" on YouTube

"Vision" is a song by Nigerian singer Qing Madi. Released on November 17, 2023, as the third single from her debut extended play, Qing Madi. A remix featuring American singer Chlöe was released on May 3, 2024.

== Background and release ==
Regarding the remix, on April 29, 2024, Qing Madi posted a photo of herself and Chlöe on her social media, captioning it "QINGS vision remix dropping this Friday". The remix was released four days later, on May 3, 2024.

== Music video ==
The music video for the remix was released on YouTube on May 3, 2024, and was directed by Pink Line.

== Live performance ==
Qing Madi performed the song "Vision" live at the Vevo DSCVR Artists to Watch event on November 22, 2023.

== Track listing ==
- Digital download and streaming
1. "Vision" – 2:26
- Digital download, streaming and CD single
1. "Vision" (with Chlöe) – 2:46
