= John Aielli =

Radio broadcaster

John Aielli (March 7, 1946 − July 31, 2022) was a radio personality known for his long-running show Eklektikos on Austin's public radio station KUT/KUTX. Eklektikos debuted in 1970 and became a staple of Austin's airwaves. Known for its freeform, unpredictable style, the program featured a wide mix of music genres. Aielli, a classically trained baritone, was a top fundraiser for the public radio station and was known for hosting the station's annual holiday singalong at the Capitol.

== Early life ==
John Aielli was born in Cincinnati in 1946. His parents met in a USO in Belton, Texas, and were jazz musicians. His father, a pianist, was in the Army during World War II, and his mother, who sang in a jazz band, was a telephone operator.

When he was 8, Aielli's parents moved to Killeen, to be near his mother's family. There Aielli studied piano and sang in the school choir, showing talent in both. He exhibited an interest in classical music, purchasing his first classical record, Mozart's Requiem, at a grocery store.

When he was 17, he earned a piano scholarship to UT Austin, but it did not cover room and board. He postponed school and applied for work at a Killeen radio station, to save money for school. Expecting to work as a janitor, he was surprised when they immediately put him on the air. He worked there as an announcer for a few years. His time there overlapped with JFK's assassination, and he announced that news to Killeen area listeners.

In 1966, he moved to Austin to attend UT. There Aielli leveraged his broadcasting experience into a job at the public radio station, KUT, which at that time was known as "The Longhorn Radio Network".

After earning a master's degree in English, he was about to begin an English PhD when he had a revelation. At age 24, he redirected himself back to music and pursued an education in voice. During this time, he continued to work at the public radio station.

== Eklektikos radio show ==
In 1970, KUT station manager, Bill Giorda, named John Aielli's show "Eklektikos", a name that reflected Aielli's broad musical sensibilities. The name came from the Greek word meaning "choosing the best". The show featured a wide range of musical genres and freewheeling interviews.

According to KUT correspondent Mose Buchele, Aielli's "fearless and improvisational approach both delighted and polarized listeners". He did things you don't ordinarily hear on the radio and did not prepare in advance. Unlike conventional radio hosts, he did not fear dead air. Aielli had a stream-of-consciousness style, once saying he liked "to fly by the seat of my pants".

Initially Aielli was only allowed to play classical music, but he pushed to include film scores and Indian classical music. Eventually he was allowed the freedom to play whatever he wanted.

In 2012 former Statesman staff writer Joe Gross wrote "... he has a free-ranging mind that can seemingly latch onto any topic and talk about it for 15, 30, 60, 90 seconds at a time." His long, meandering talks with guests were a trademark of Eklektikos.

KUTX program director Matt Reilly said Aielli was commanding a large audience, but doing everything 'the wrong way'. Attempts by station managers to rein him in did not work because the audience loved the show's freeform nature and the way Aielli marched to his own drum. As radio broadcasting conventions became less free-form, Eklektikos sounded "weirder" by comparison.

The Austin Chronicle media critic, Robert Faires characterized Eklektios in 2022 saying:

But Eklektikos fans -- who are legion, as is clear from any KUT fund drive -- will tell you that the breadth of musical programming is only the jumping-off point for the program's singular and compelling broadcast mix. What makes the show more than just an alternative to commercial radio, more than just entertainment, something that approaches -- hang on, readers, I'm really gonna say it -- art, is Aielli's willingness to use any piece of music as a point of departure for some sort of journey: an exploration of theme, of musical form, of cultural commentary, of artistic interpretation.

In the beginning "Eklektikos" ran from 8 a.m. to 2 p.m. The show moved from KUT to KUTX, in 2013 when the public radio station split news and music across two frequencies. In 2001, the show's runtime began to scale back, eventually airing from 9 a.m. to noon. After a stroke in 2020 KUT/KUTX announced Aielli's retirement, ending a 50-year run of Eklektikos. From 1966 to 2020 Aielli had logged more than 60,000 hours on the air, including the 1966 to 1970 period before the show was named Eklektikos.

After 74 Aielli suffered a stroke in the spring of 2020 Taylor Wallace replaced Aielli in his weekday morning time slot.

== Health setbacks and death ==
Beginning with a 2012 heart attack, Aielli suffered several health setbacks. He had a stroke in the spring of 2020 after which he stepped back from regular on-air duties at KUTX. Aielli died Sunday, July 31, 2022 at age 76.

== Legacy ==
Aielli was a popular host and won the Austin Chronicle's Best of Austin awards many times, including:

- 1990 for Best Morning Deejay (or Team)
- 1991 for Best Morning Deejay (or Team)
- 1992 tie for Best Morning Deejay (or Team)
- 1996 for Best Radio Talk Show Host
- 1997 for Culture, Best Arts Exposure
- 1998 for Best Radio Talk Show Host
- 2000 for Best Local Talk Radio Host
- 2001 for Best Locally Produced Radio Show
- 2001 tie for Best Morning Radio Host
- 2002 for Best Morning Radio Host
- 2003 for Best Morning Radio Host
- 2006 tie for Best Radio Deejay
- 2010 for Best Radio Deejay

=== PBS special: Faders Up ===
In December 2024 the Austin PBS station, KLRU, broadcast a special titled, Faders Up: The John Aielli Experience. KUTX described the special as

"... John Aielli is profiled here in this new film that shines a light on his early life and scholarly personality. The filmmakers lovingly depict the man and his unique style of music curation and storytelling."
