= America By the Numbers with Maria Hinojosa: Clarkston Georgia =

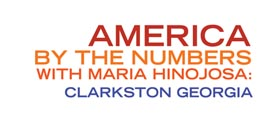
- America By the Numbers logo
- Written by: Martha Spanninger
- Directed by: Martha Spanninger
- Starring: Maria Hinojosa
- Composer: Wendy Blackstone

Production
- Producers: Maria Hinojosa; Martha Spanninger; Xochitl Dorsey
- Cinematography: Paul de Lumen
- Editor: Chris Fiore

Original release
- Network: PBS
- Release: September 21, 2012

America by The Numbers with Maria Hinojosa: Clarkston Georgia is a half-hour television program, airing as a Need to Know Election 2012 special on PBS. It premiered on September 21, 2012.

== Production ==
America by The Numbers with Maria Hinojosa: Clarkston Georgia is produced by The Futuro Media Group and hosted by Maria Hinojosa. It is the first full-length television program to be produced by The Futuro Media Group and the first public affairs program on PBS to be both executive produced and anchored by a Latina woman.

Produced with the support of:

- The National Minority Consortia
- Ford Foundation
- Marguerite Casey Foundation

== Content ==
America By The Numbers with Maria Hinojosa: Clarkston Georgia is the story of a small town of 7,500 people that has gone from being 90% white in the 1980s to less than 14% white today. Located in the shadow of Stone Mountain, once a gathering place for Ku Klux Klan cross burnings, today Clarkston, Georgia is home to thousands of refugees from Vietnam, Somalia, Iraq and Bhutan – along with some 40 other countries. The program is a look at one of the most diverse communities in America and how changing demographics are reshaping the political landscape in America.

== Critical reception ==
Early critical reception has been positive. Esther Cepeda of The Holland Sentinel states that the program is "simply an example of how diversity truly plays a leading role in helping the melting pot make new Americans out of recent arrivals. It's also a celebration of an America where a Hispanic journalist can skillfully illuminate the experiences of a unique group of recent immigrants and their nervous neighbors without ever having to utter a word of Spanish."
