= Daisy Rosario =

American podcast host and producer

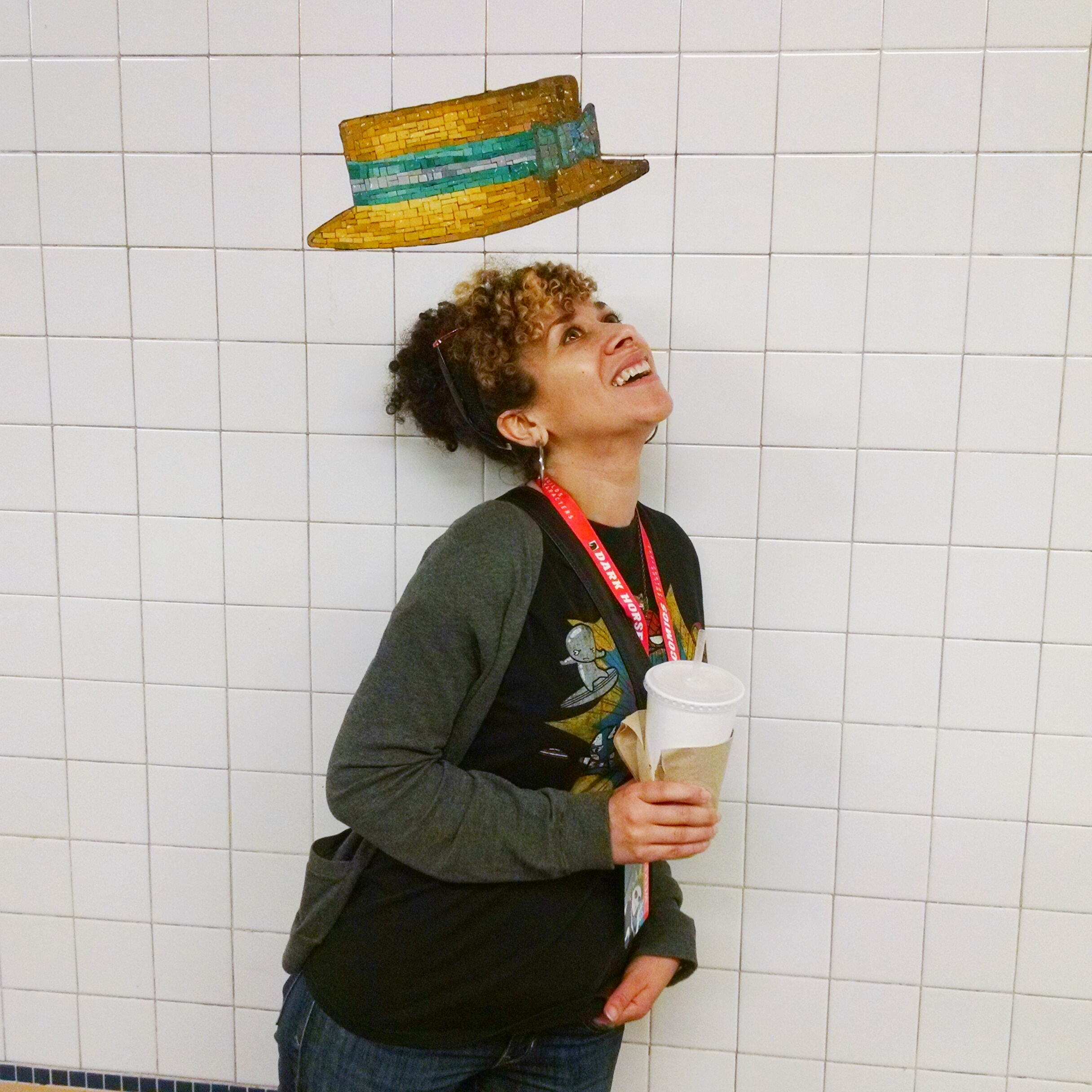
- Rosario in the 23rd St New York City subway station
- Born: Brooklyn, New York, U.S.
- Education: New York University; CUNY Graduate School of Journalism
- Occupations: Journalist; storyteller; comedian

Daisy Marie Rosario is an American public radio personality and producer. She is currently senior supervising producer of audio for Slate. Previously, she was an executive producer at Stitcher, where she oversaw podcasts on the Stitcher Original label and developed new narrative-driven podcasts and talk shows. She regularly appears as a guest on NPR's Pop Culture Happy Hour.

== Education ==
Originally from Brooklyn, NY, Rosario graduated from Edward R. Murrow High School. She earned a BFA from NYU's Tisch School of the Arts and a Master's degree from the CUNY Graduate School of Journalism and was a 2015 USC Annenberg Health Reporting Fellow.

== Media career ==
Rosario's story "Child of Trouble" appeared on the Peabody Award-winning 2010 season of The Moth Radio Hour and was used to present the award. While at CUNY, Rosario interned at Radiolab and in 2012 at Latino USA, where she reported on health, science, "geek" culture, race, and identity. At Latino USA, she served as line producer, guest host, and senior producer.

At WNYC, Rosario and produced the podcast Sooo Many White Guys, hosted by Phoebe Robinson. In 2017, she joined WAMU as a managing producer, first for the radio show The Big Listen and then for The Pod Shop, WAMU's initiative to support DC-area emerging podcasters, for which she also served as lead instructor. In 2019, Rosario served as a judge in the Third Coast International Audio Festival. That same year, she left WAMU to become an executive producer at Stitcher.

Rosario also hosted the Mic video series Future Perfect.
