= Danny Malboeuf =

American painter

Danny Malboeuf is a visual artist and musician. As kolaboy he is a member of the breedArt collective and a Senior Member of DeviantArt, where four of his paintings have received the site's top award. His musical project is Cowgirl in the Snow.

== Art ==
Danny Malboeuf is a self-trained artist/illustrator. Working mainly in acrylics, he paints in an allegorical figurative style that combines surrealist, symbolist and pre-Raphaelite sensibilities, often in conjunction with subtle pop-culture references. Malboeuf counts music and literature as his greatest sources of inspiration; specific artistic influences include the painters Arnold Boecklin, John Martin, Ferdinand Khnopff, and Leon Frédéric. While many of his paintings deal with mythological and religious themes, the frequent incorporation of sci-fi and pop-culture imagery from the artist's youth establishes tentative connections with movements such as pop surrealism. He has a strong bias towards painting female subjects, "perhaps because the essence of female is more poetic, and the male more prosaic."

Malboeuf is represented by The Queen's Gallery and Art Center in Charlotte, North Carolina, and is a member of the international Surreal Visionary Art Collective. In the past twenty years, his work has been exhibited in numerous solo and joint exhibitions, including one at the Huntington Museum of Art, and his paintings can now be found in private collections in Europe, America, Asia and Australia.

Malboeuf's outsider leanings and penchant for dark themes and forbidden mixtures can be disquieting or even controversial. "If you've never contemplated the odd, spellbinding paintings by Charlotte original Danny Malboeuf, now's your chance to catch up. An uneasy feeling mixed with awe at the artist's painterly skill is not unusual with these acrylics. Holy Water and Consecration of St. Joan both deliver a biting admixture of religion and sexuality." Another critique reads "This artist's idiosyncratic slice of surrealism, dark and Gothic, is imbued with a strong dose of high-techno metallica in a strange quasi-religious vein that incites uneasy thoughts. If Edgar Allan Poe and H.P. Lovecraft rose from the dead and co-wrote a series of stories – and Max Ernst collaborated with Dante Gabriel Rossetti using Giger's Alien as a prototype to illustrate these collaborative tales – the result might resemble Malboueuf's series of images. [...] Malboeuf's intensely symbolic paintings do occasionally depict a sunnier mood, [...] but more common is a decaying, bittersweet morbidity – futuristic pre-Rapahelite paintings corrupted by the forces of the darkside. There's a repellent attraction to this work that's compelling." On the academic front, Malboeuf's painting Holy Water is the subject of a Master's dissertation.

Online, where he uses the screen-name kolaboy, Malboeuf is a member of the breedArt collective; he also holds Senior Member status at DeviantArt, where his online gallery has had over 213 000-page-views and is subscribed to by some 2700 members. He is listed in DeviantArt's Top Artists directory and has four times won the site's top Daily Deviation award, a recent win being accompanied by the editorial observation "One of dA's finest Surreal artists, kolaboy never ceases to amaze."

Three of Malboeuf's paintings have been published in Mostro, an Italian-language literary/art journal, with one gracing the cover. His paintings have also been featured on the cover of OLOGY magazine, with the editorial comment "Speaking of things that are sweet, check out this issue's cover artist, Danny Malboeuf. Take a good look, folks, because long after we are all dead, people will still be talking about his work." His artwork is featured on the cover of Bandersnatch, a hardcover anthology of horror stories, as well as on the cover of the Ruby Vileos album This is the Day. His painting The Eternal was featured in Web Digest Weekly. Three of his paintings are reproduced in the literary/arts journal Antithesis Common.

Malboeuf has also provided two invited pieces for the Pornsaints website; his art was included in their 2008 exhibition at A&D Gallery in central London, and their 2010 exhibition at the Birdhouse Gallery in Austin, Texas. Firebird was chosen to illustrate the exhibition review in the Austin Chronicle; as arts critic Wayne Brenner observed, "[M]ost of the depictions of saintly pornstars are depictions of women. Which is fine by this (admittedly biased) reviewer ... especially when the artwork is as gorgeous as Danny Malboeuf's finely detailed and cyberpunky Firebird painting". Also in 2010, Malboeuf was described as "a Surrealist for our times" in a review for The 405, a music and culture magazine. The October 2010 issue of visual arts magazine n-sphere featured Malboeuf's art on the cover and in the lead article, accompanied by a 26-work exhibition in The Spheres guest gallery. A positive review of Malboeuf's Statesville exhibition in early 2014 noted the artist's reclusive nature and prolific output, estimated at 6000 paintings. Malboeuf's work was also exhibited internationally in the Endangered Visions show at ManilArt 2014 in the Philippines.

In 2016, three paintings were featured in Buffalo Zine, with the editorial observation "There's something both sweet and incredibly perverse about Danny Malboeuf's paintings. Under the pseudonym KOLABOY, the North Carolina artist depicts a world in which young girls are free to engage in abstract acts of ritual fun with each other -- it feels almost like we shouldn't be looking." He is cited as an inspiration for the artist NED (Ned M. Stacey).

Solo exhibitions

- 1990 First Union National Bank, Statesville, NC.
- 1995 Beauties of Provenient Grace, Queens Gallery and Art Center, Charlotte, NC.
- 1995 Exposure of Conviction, Rowe Art Gallery, Univ. North Carolina at Charlotte, NC.
- 2014 LaCoste, Court Street Gallery, Iredell Museums, Statesville, NC.
- 2019 The Atrocities Show, Court Street Gallery, Iredell Museums, Statesville, NC.

== Music ==
A singer/songwriter and instrumentalist, Malboeuf's solo music project is Cowgirl in the Snow; it straddles the indie, twee, and shoegaze genres, releasing candy-coated dream pop songs in the spirit of Sarah Records and 4AD. Musical influences include Ultra Vivid Scene and The Records. A review reads: “Cowgirl in the Snow makes addictive lo-fi indie pop, with guitars drenched in effects … Twee pop at its finest.” Danny Malboeuf's brother is David, who is the musician D. M. Frankin Kane and his father was the bluegrass fiddler "Red" Tommy Malboeuf.

== Writing ==
As well as featuring Malboeuf's art in 2006, OLOGY Magazine also showcased some of his writing. Buffalo Zine did likewise in 2016.

Early in 2011, Malboeuf published an illustrated book, Saestralle – A Tale of the North, which presents a poetic legend imagined in the Arctic region. He has since published other illustrated books which are suitable for young readers.
