= Ogechi Ogwudu =

Nigerian taekwondo practitioner

Personal information
- Full name: Ogechi Ogwudu
- Nationality: Nigerian

Sport
- Sport: Taekwondo
Medal record
Women's taekwondo
Representing Nigeria
African Taekwondo Championships
Bronze medal – third place	2009 Yaounde	57 kg

Ogechi Ogwudu is a Nigerian taekwondo practitioner. She won a bronze medal at the 2009 African Taekwondo Championships in the –57 kg category.

== International honors ==
African Championship
Year	Place	Medal	Category
2009	Yaoundé (Cameroon)	Bronze	–57 kg
