= Llona =

Nigerian singer and songwriter (born 1996)

- Born: Michael Ajuma Attah; 14 December 1996 (age 29); Kogi State, Nigeria
- Genres: Afro-fusion, afro-pop
- Occupations: Singer; songwriter
- Instrument: Vocals
- Label: Independent

Michael Ajuma Attah (born 14 December 1996), popularly known as Llona, is a Nigerian singer, songwriter, and performing artist. Known for his debut album "Homeless" which peaked at 11 on the Official Top 100 Albums TurnTable charts in Nigeria. His sound and introspective mental health lyricism was heavily influenced by Northern Nigerian culture through his formative years in Kano State.

== Early life ==
Micheal Ajuma Attah is a native of Kogi State, Nigeria, growing up Kano State, Llona was surrounded by a blend of traditional and contemporary influences that ignited his passion for storytelling and music. His Northern roots are reflected in the authenticity of his sound, blending Afro-pop with themes that resonate with the challenges and aspirations of modern youth.

== Career ==
In June 2024, Llona released a single titled "Cold War" featuring Fave which debuted on official TurnTable Nigeria Top 100 chart at 97. On July 25th, 2024, Llona released his debut album, "Homeless" with positive critical responses, the 12-track album includes the singles "HBP” Remix with Bella Shmurda, "Cold War" with Fave, and "Another Day". "Homeless" peaked at 11 on the TurnTable Official Top 100 Albums Chart in Nigeria earning him a debut on the TurnTable charts artiste top 100.

== Awards and nominations ==
List of awards and nominations received by Llona
Organization	Year	Award	Recipient or nominee	Result	Ref.
The Headies	2025	Rookie of the Year	Llona	Nominated	
The Headies	2025	Songwriter of the Year	Michael Ajuma Attah – "Can't Breathe" by Llona	Nominated	

== Discography ==
=== Selected singles ===
As lead artist
Year	Title	Album
2022	"Nobody"	Non-album single
2023	"HBP"	Homeless
2024	"HBP (Remix)" (feat. Bella Shmurda)	Homeless
2024	"Cold War" (feat. Fave)	Homeless
2024	"Another Day"	Homeless
2024	"Comforter"	Homeless
2024	"Can't Breathe"	Homeless
2024	"How I Live"	Non-album single
2025	"Dead Flowers"	TBA
2025	"Lonely Road" (with T.I Blaze)	TBA
As featured artist
Year	Title	Album
2024	"Gone Rogue" (Monaky feat. Llona)	Candor
2025	"Look To You" (Fridayy feat. Llona)	Some Days I'm Good, Some Days I'm Not

=== Albums ===
- **Homeless** (2024)
  - Tracklist: "Still Scared", "Commander" (feat. Wizard Chan), "Can't Breathe", "Another Day", "HBP (Remix)" (feat. Bella Shmurda), "Stranger", "Gangsta Love Letter", "Cold War" (feat. Fave), "Comforter", "Billion Paper", "Rollercoaster", "Forgive Me".
