= Adeola Fayehun =

Nigerian journalist

- Born: Adeola Eunice Oladele; 6 July 1984 (age 41); Nigeria
- Other names: Eunice Fayehun
- Education: Olivet College; CUNY Graduate School of Journalism
- Occupation: Journalist
- Years active: 2011-present
- Known for: Keeping It Real with Adeola!
- Website: adeolafayehun.com

Adeola Eunice Oladele Fayehun (born 6 July 1984) is a Nigerian journalist who specializes in discussing current geopolitical, social and economic issues that affect the daily lives of Africans living on the continent. She is well known for a controversial 2015 street interview where she and fellow Sahara TV journalist Omoyele Sowore asked Zimbabwean President Robert Mugabe when he would be stepping down from office. In 2013, she interviewed former Nigerian President Goodluck Jonathan in New York City and asked him what he was doing about the then ongoing Boko Haram insurgency.

== Early life ==
Fayehun was born in Nigeria. Her parents, Rev. Dr. Solomon Ajayi Oladele and Margaret Ibiladun Oladele (née Abolarin), worked as missionaries in Nigeria. She has five older siblings, and is the youngest child. She comes from Yoruba ethnic group of south-western Nigeria and speaks the language fluently.

Adeola began college in Nigeria working toward a degree in linguistics. In 2003, at 19, she moved to the United States to continue college after getting a scholarship through the National Association of Congregational Christian Churches. She graduated from Olivet College in Olivet, Michigan with a B.A. in Mass Communications and Journalism in 2007. At Olivet she worked in radio and was a writer for the college newspaper. As part of a school project, Fayehun also founded the Olivet College TV Studio. In 2008, Fayehun received a master's degree in broadcast journalism from CUNY Graduate School of Journalism.

== Career ==
In 2009, after graduate school, Fayehun worked at CUNY TV as a TV news producer. During this time she wrote and produced a feature on Sahara Reporters's Omoyele Sowore, who she later went on to work with in a behind-the-scenes capacity at Sahara Reporters. In 2010, Fayehun became a U.S. correspondent for the Nigerian newspaper, The Nation.

In 2010, Fayehun founded African Spotlight, where she published content about Africa.

In April 2011, Fayehun began the news satire program, Keeping It Real with Adeola! on SaharaTV. The show was 30 minutes long and featured Fayehun reporting, often in character, on various African news events. The focus of the show was on reporting political issues pertinent to Africa and of interest to the African diaspora community. For the first 150-plus episodes created over a period of three years, Fayehun was the producer, writer, and editor of the show.

In November 2017, Fayehun left SaharaTV to work as an independent creator, publishing new content on her YouTube channel about African politics in a continuation of her weekly satire show Keeping It Real with Adeola!.

Often compared to comedian Jon Stewart, Fayehun uses satire and comedy to explain news events in self-produced videos. Fayehun also works as a foreign correspondent for The Nation, a Nigerian national daily newspaper based in Lagos, Nigeria.

=== Notable interviews ===
- 2013: Former Nigerian President Goodluck Jonathan on Boko Haram and the Sovereign wealth fund
- 2015: Nigerian President Muhammadu Buhari on addressing corruption, the Nigerian economy
- 2015: Nigerian Vice President Yemi Osinbajo
- 2015: Zimbabwe President Robert Mugabe on ending presidency, as he attended the inauguration of the Nigerian President Muhammadu Buhari on 29 May.

== Honors ==
- 2008: Foreign Press Association, New York, NY, "Outstanding Academic And Professional Achievement"
- 2014: Ethiopian Satellite News Network (ESAT), Washington DC, "Excellence In Journalism For Democracy Award"
- 2015: CUNY Graduate School of Journalism, "Best One Woman Show"

== Personal life ==
In 2011, Fayehun married Victor Fayehun in Nigeria. Fayehun and her husband created a non-profit foundation called KIRWA Foundation that provides aid to terminally ill in Africa.
