= KUT =

Public radio station at the University of Texas at Austin

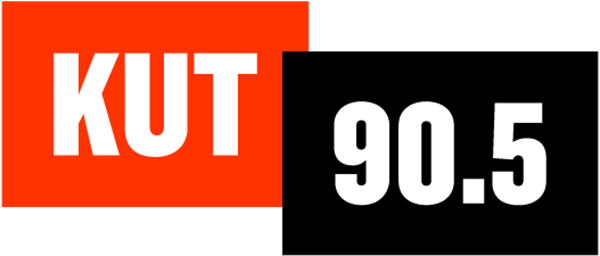

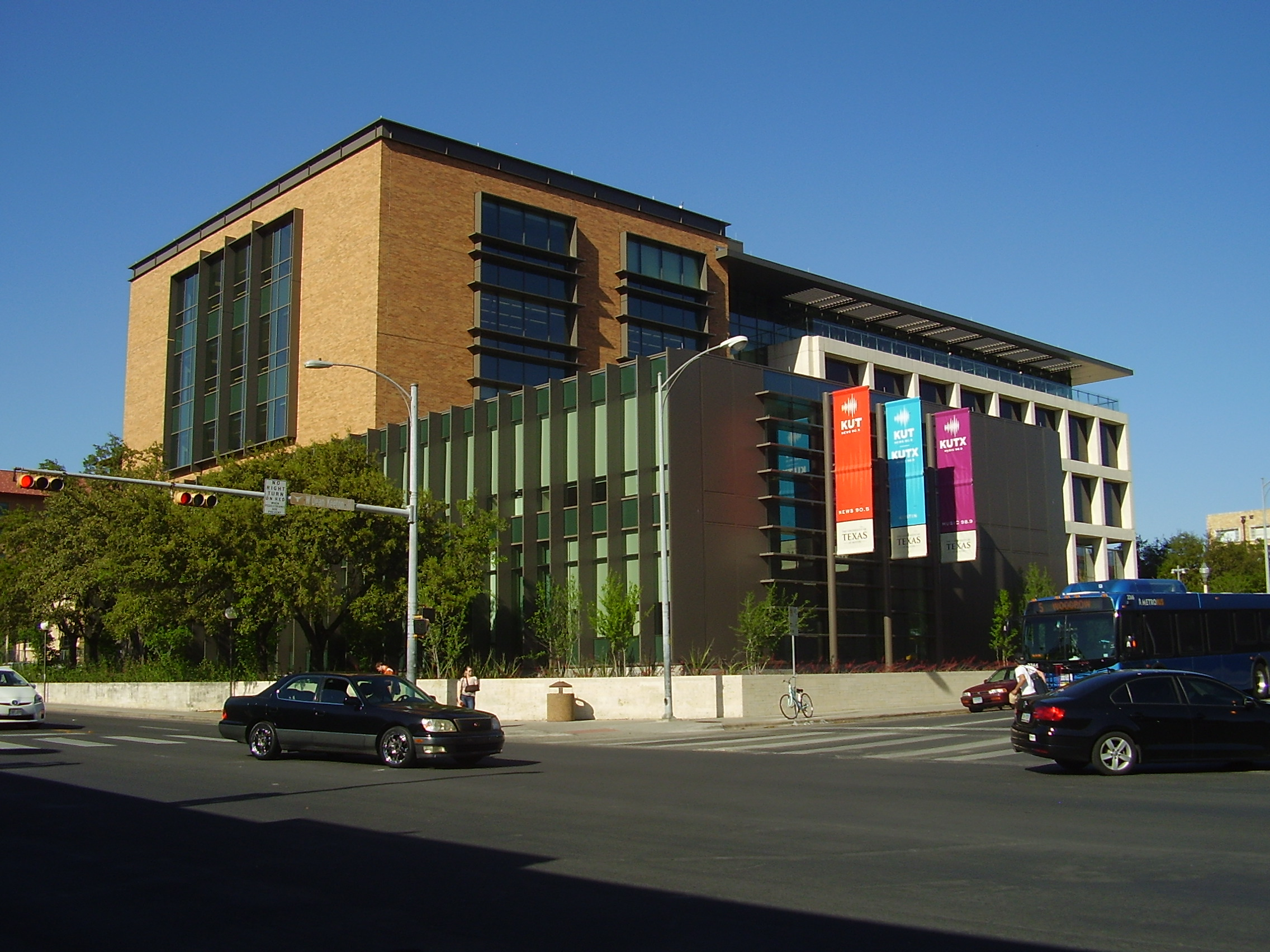
- Belo Center for New Media (A0704) - KUT/KUTX offices
- Austin, Texas; United States
- Broadcast area: Austin metro area
- Frequencies: 90.5 MHz (HD Radio); 90.5 HD-2 BBC World Service; HD-3 TMX.fm
- Branding: KUT 90.5

Programming
- Format: News/Talk (Public)
- Affiliations: NPR

Ownership
- Owner: Moody College of Communication, The University of Texas at Austin
- Sister stations: KUTX, KVRX

History
- First air date: November 10, 1958
- Former call signs: KUT-FM (1958–1982)
- Call sign meaning: University of Texas

Technical information
- Facility ID: 66573
- Class: C1
- ERP: 24,500 watts
- HAAT: 389 meters (1,276 ft)
- Transmitter coordinates: 30.3142°N 97.8661°W

Links
- Webcast: KUT Live Feed
- Website: kut.org tmx.fm (HD3)

KUT (90.5 FM) is a listener and community supported public radio station based in Austin, Texas. KUT is owned and operated by the University of Texas at Austin. It is the National Public Radio member station for central Texas. Its studio operations are located on campus at the Dealey Center for New Media (A0704) on West Dean Keaton Street. KUT is one of three radio outlets based on UT campus alongside student-run KVRX 91.7 FM and KUTX 98.9 FM.

KUT's main transmitter broadcasts with an effective radiated power of 24,500 watts, and is located 8 miles west of Downtown Austin at the University of Texas Bee Cave Research Center. KUT is licensed to broadcast in the digital hybrid HD format.

A second station, KUTX, serving San Angelo at 90.1 MHz, was sold to Texas Tech University in 2010 in part because Angelo State University had become part of the Texas Tech University System. The call letters were changed from KUTX to KNCH. The KUTX call letters were moved to KUT's repeater station in Somerville, broadcasting to the Bryan/College Station area on 88.1 FM. On August 23, 2012, the UT System Board of Regents voted to move forward to purchase KXBT-FM 98.9 FM (Leander/Austin) from Border Media Business Trust. On January 2, 2013, KXBT became KUTX, creating an Austin-based sister station for KUT. At that time, KUT adopted an all-news/talk format utilizing programming from NPR, the BBC, PRI and others. The music programming formerly heard on KUT was moved to KUTX to create a full-time music service, primarily an eclectic mix of alt pop/rock, folk, Americana, bluegrass, jazz, blues supplemented by specialty programs including Twine Time, Folkways, Across the Water (Celtic music), and Horizontes (Latin music).

== HD programming ==
- KUT HD1 is a digital version of the over-the-air analog signal.
- KUT HD2 is the BBC World Service.
- KUT HD3 is TMX.fm

(An HD Radio is required for all HD stations.)

== Local productions ==
Local productions include In Black America (hosted by John L. Hanson Jr.) and Texas Standard (hosted by David Brown). Latino USA with Maria Hinojosa originated at KUT, but is now independently produced.

Former music shows that moved to KUTX include Eklektikos, hosted by John Aielli (with KUT since 1966); Left of the Dial; and shows hosted by Jay Trachtenberg, and Jody Denberg.

== Funding ==
Like other public radio stations in the United States, KUT broadcasts on-air pledge drives in order to raise monetary contributions from listeners. Listener contributions and businesssponsorship, termed "community support," account for roughly 80% of the station's budget. Sponsors are noted on-air in the form of abbreviated announcements called underwriting spots.

== History ==
=== University of Texas' early radio activities ===
The actual beginning date of radio transmissions on the UT-Austin campus has never been fully substantiated. There is an unofficial reference to an on-campus radio operation as early as 1912. But the most reliable information indicates that the first authorization was an experimental radio station license – bearing the call sign 5XU – that was issued to the University on March 22, 1921.

A year later, on March 22, 1922, a new AM band broadcasting station license was issued, bearing the randomly assigned call letters WCM. In its first years, the broadcasting station was used for a number of purposes, beginning as a demonstration project in the Physics Department, whose Professor Simpson L. Brown had persuaded the administration to let him build the station in the first place. Beginning in 1923, though, funding concerns prompted a transfer of operational control to the University's Extension Division for extension teaching. One of the stipulations of the transfer agreement was that funds would be provided for operations and maintenance to put the station in a "first-class" condition. The funds, however, did not materialize and broadcasting suffered until a state agriculture official needed a means to broadcast daily crop and weather reports.

A deal between the official and UT's Extension Division allowed agriculture broadcasts for one hour per day in exchange for equipment maintenance. At other times of the day, the University would broadcast items of interest from the campus, including a number of faculty lecture series. But by the end of 1924, the Physics Department decided it wanted the station back, and with the approval of the Board of Regents, the Physics Department regained control in the summer of 1925. They had a new license granted on October 30 and it bore, for the first time, the call letters KUT.

=== KUT history 1925-1929 ===
Professor Simpson L. Brown – in addition to his teaching and research work in the Physics Department – served simultaneously as general manager, technical director, and producer. Programs were aired 3 nights a week from 8 to 10 with no sponsors or commercials. There were concerts by the University Symphony and other Austin musical organizations as well as discussions, lectures, and speeches by faculty, state officials, and agriculture experts. Weekly services were broadcast from St. David's Episcopal Church and, during football season, fans could listen to play-by-play descriptions of the Longhorn games.

KUT's early years were ambitious but, by 1927, ambition had outrun the funding. The expense of operating and maintaining the station had simply become too great for the Physics Department to sustain. University President Harry Benedict appointed a committee to study the matter, and the committee recommended that the project be discontinued. In 1929 The station equipment was dismantled and returned to the Physics labs for experimentation, and KUT's license was sold and converted to a commercial station, which is now KTRH in Houston. The University of Texas would not return to the airwaves until thirty years later, this time on the FM band.

=== KUT chronology 1958 to present ===
1958 – Signed on as KUT-FM on November 10, licensed to the University of Texas as an Educational station broadcasting at 90.7 MHz from the School of Journalism (now Geography) building at Whitis Avenue & 24th Street, using a General Electric transmitter built in 1939: power (4,100 watts), antenna height (268 feet), total signal radius (15 miles).

1961 – Moved to newly refurbished quarters in the Radio/Television building on Speedway, a site now occupied by Robert A. Welch Hall.

1965 – Reformatted to an arts and information program schedule following the demise of Austin's commercial classical music station (KHFI), and began the first live Saturday afternoon airings in Austin of the Metropolitan Opera radio broadcasts.

1970 – Station was qualified by the Corporation for Public Broadcasting (CPB) to receive financial assistance provided to noncommercial radio stations for the first time ever by the federal government. Of the some 600 noncommercial radio stations that were licensed by the FCC at the time, only KUT and 69 others met the CPB qualification criteria.

1971 – Became a charter member of National Public Radio (NPR); contributed the first of, what would become in time, 14 of the station's employees to the NPR staff; and carried the first-ever NPR broadcast (All Things Considered) in May.

1974 – Moved to completely new, specially designed quarters in the College of Communication complex at Guadalupe & 26th Street.

1975 – Hosted Bob Edwards, then co-anchoring All Things Considered, and the NPR news production team during dedication week for the new Communication complex. The national All Things Considered broadcasts were transmitted each evening that week from the new KUT studio facilities.

1979 – Carried the November inaugural broadcast of NPR's Morning Edition, with Bob Edwards as host; KUT joined 106 other NPR member-stations in launching the national public radio program.

1980 – Installed its new public radio network satellite earth terminal and became NPR's southwestern regional uplink, one of only 17 network stations with the capability to transmit as well as receive satellite-delivered radio programs. Production of In Black America moved from Houston to KUT Austin. It is still hosted weekly by John L. Hanson Jr.

1982 – Call letters changed from KUT-FM to KUT. Began broadcasting in stereo at 90.5 MHz with 100,000 watts of power, antenna height at 1,595 feet, and a total signal radius of 97 miles—bringing to fruition the federal funding and extraordinarily lengthy regulatory application process that had been started in 1972.

1984 – Won the Texas Governor's Barbara Jordan Award for "excellence in the communication of the reality of disabled people" through the production of SoundSight, a weekly news-and-features program for blind and print-impaired listeners.

1986 – Won, jointly with the UT McDonald Observatory, The Ohio State University Award for production of the astronomy radio series Star Date. The series was cited for "excellence in educational, informational, and public affairs broadcasting."

1988 – Celebrated its 30th anniversary with a series of special events, capped by "An Evening with Bob Edwards", NPR's Morning Edition host.

1990 – Was recognized, for the 10th consecutive year, as the "Best Radio Station" in Austin by The Austin Chronicle's readers' poll.

1991 – Held a special one-day fundraiser to assist NPR in meeting emergency budget needs for news coverage of the Persian Gulf War. The $25,000 raised by KUT was the second highest amount raised among all of NPR's participating member-stations.

1992 – Presented the first of its continuing annual celebrations of the short story—Selected Shorts on Tour—a collaboration with New York City's Symphony Space, producer of NPR's weekly series Selected Shorts (now distributed by Public Radio International).

1993 – Celebrated its 35th anniversary and—in partnership with UT Austin's Center for Mexican American Studies and with major initial grants from The Ford Foundation and the Corporation for Public Broadcasting—launched the national radio series Latino USA at a "Cinco de Mayo" reception in Washington, D.C., with President Clinton in attendance along with members of the Congressional Hispanic Caucus and cabinet secretaries Federico Peña and Henry Cisneros.

1994 – Completed the construction of a new on-air control room and library suite, using 50 percent federal matching funds to replace and upgrade the equipment in this control room and in the production control room; total project cost was in excess of $100,000.

1995 – Achieved a listenership benchmark according to Arbitron research: more than 100,000 people were listening to the station each week.

1996 – Completed the installation of its second station (KUTX 90.1 FM) using 75 percent federal matching funds and, delivering its signal via satellite, initiated a first public radio service for the 100,000 residents of San Angelo in the West Texas heartland; total project cost was upwards of $150,000.

2013 - KUTX, KUT's sister station, launched, providing 24/7 non-stop music focusing on bringing the local music scene to a national audience.

== See also ==
- List of radio stations in Texas
- List of three-letter broadcast call signs in the United States
