= Craig Newmark Graduate School of Journalism at the City University of New York =

Journalism school in New York City

Coordinates: 40.75523°N 73.988827°W

Craig Newmark Graduate School of Journalism at CUNY
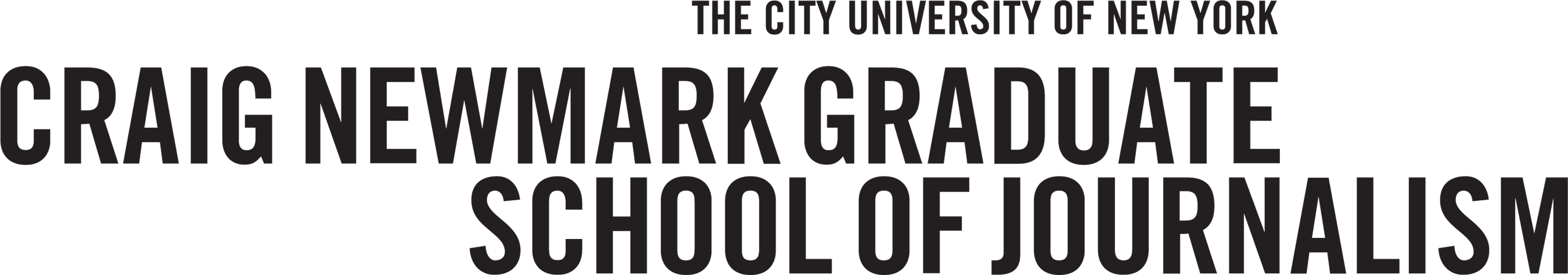
- Type: Public journalism school
- Established: May 5, 2004
- Dean: Graciela Mochkofsky
- Faculty: 105
- Students: 170
- Location: New York City, United States
- Campus: Urban
- Website: journalism.cuny.edu

The Craig Newmark Graduate School of Journalism at the City University of New York is a public graduate journalism school located in New York City, New York, United States. One of the 25 institutions comprising the City University of New York, or CUNY, the school opened in 2006. It is the only public graduate school of journalism in the northeastern United States.

The Newmark Graduate School of Journalism grants two Master of Arts degrees, the Master of Arts in Journalism, including a version with a bilingual subject concentration in English and Spanish, and the nation's first Master of Arts in Engagement Journalism. The school requires its MA students to complete a summer internship at a news organization in order to graduate.

Graciela Mochkofsky is the third Dean of the Newmark Graduate School of Journalism. She succeeded Sarah Bartlett, who served as Dean from January 2014 to June 2022, and founding Dean Stephen B. Shepard, who headed the school from 2005 to 2014.

In June 2018, the school announced it would change its name from the City University of New York's CUNY Graduate School of Journalism to the Craig Newmark Graduate School of Journalism at the City University of New York, after the Craigslist founder donated $20 million to the school's foundation.

== History ==
The CUNY Board of Trustees approved the Graduate School of Journalism's creation in May 2004. Proposed by CUNY Chancellor Matthew Goldstein, the school was to focus on teaching reporting skills and news values at a time when other journalism schools were emphasizing education in academic disciplines such as political science and statistics.

After a search that weighed dozens of journalists and educators, former BusinessWeek editor-in-chief Stephen B. Shepard was chosen as the school's first dean. Goldstein and Shephard had worked together before; as head of CUNY's research foundation, Goldstein helped BusinessWeek formulate its business school rankings in the 1980s. Former New York Daily News editor Pete Hamill was also among those considered.

The school admitted its first class, comprising 57 students, in the fall of 2006. Dean Baquet, now executive editor of The New York Times, spoke at the school's first graduation ceremony in December 2007 and received an honorary degree. Veteran broadcast journalist and presidential aide Bill Moyers addressed students at the school's second graduation commencement ceremony a year later.

== Governance ==
The school has a strong culture of community governance. A Governance Council composed of full-time faculty, adjuncts, staff, students, and alumni meets once a semester to consider and vote on curriculum, policy, and standards. In addition to an executive committee that considers matters requiring a decision between regular Governance Council meetings, there are six standing committees: Campus Life and Facilities, Curriculum and Degree Requirements, Diversity, Outcomes Assessment, Strategic Planning, and Technology and Library. The by-laws and other relevant materials are on the Governance Council page in the About section of the website, journalism.cuny.edu.

== Campus ==
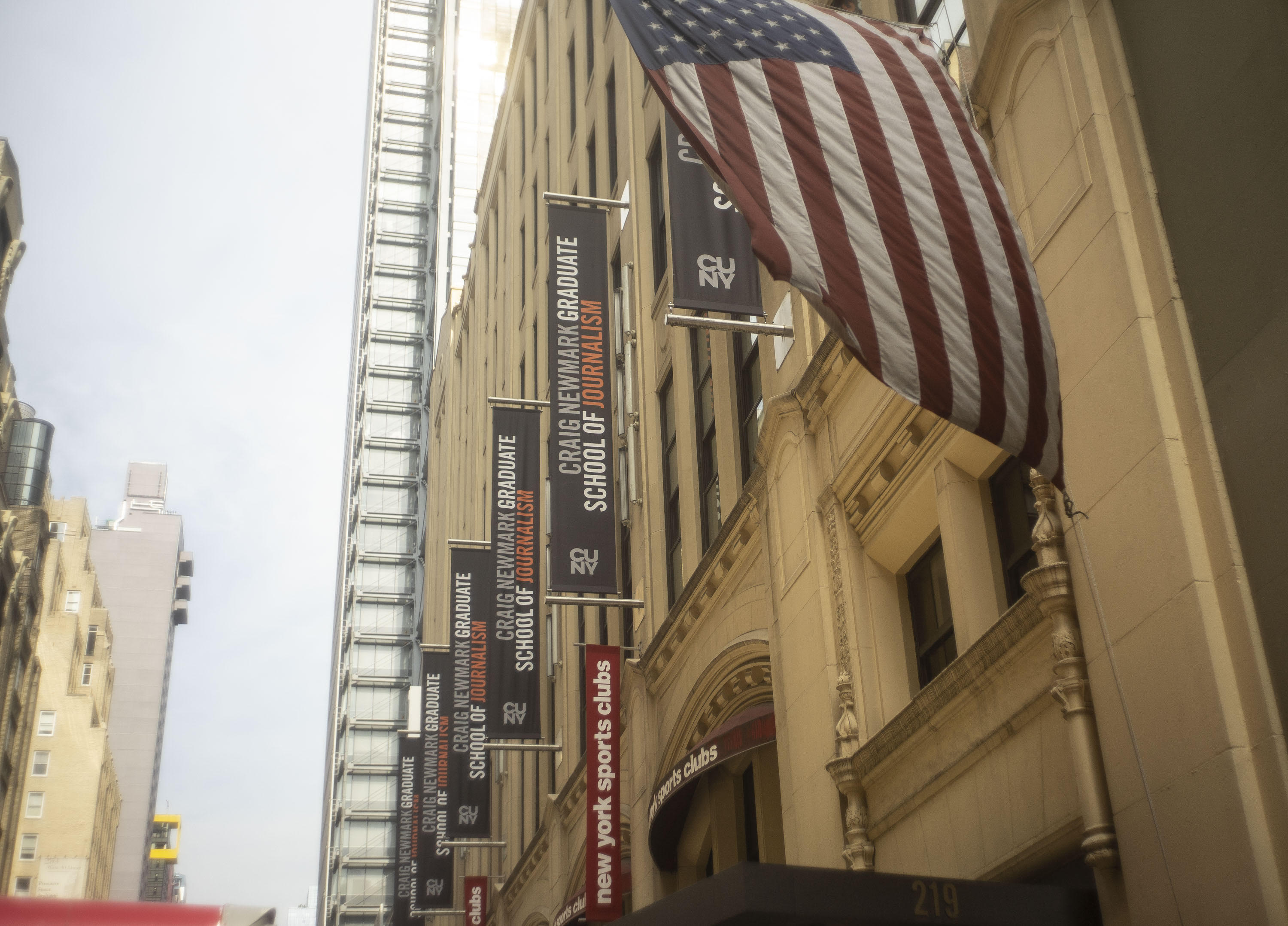
Craig Newmark Graduate School of Journalism in the renovated former headquarters of the old New York Herald Tribune on West 40th Street

The Newmark Graduate School of Journalism is located in Midtown Manhattan, near Times Square. It is housed in the former headquarters of the New York Herald Tribune on West 40th Street, which CUNY purchased in August 2004 for $60 million. Renovation of the building cost $10.7 million and took place at the same time that The New York Times was building a new, 52-story office tower to house its headquarters next door.

The campus building houses a newsroom with seats for 130, a broadcast studio, several multimedia editing suites, a fully digital library and research center with 1,500 books on journalism, as well as numerous classrooms.

In 2006, the school hosted a reunion of about 100 former New York Herald Tribune journalists to commemorate the 40th anniversary of the paper's closing in 1966. The school also regularly runs panel discussions and other events relevant to the field of journalism and journalism education as well as issues in the news.

== Curriculum ==
The school's three-semester MA in Journalism program formerly included media tracks in print, interactive and broadcast, though in March 2009 the requirement to choose a track was removed. It also offers subject concentrations in arts/culture, bilingual, business/economics, health/science, international, and urban reporting. Students participate in a summer internship for which they receive at least $4,000 in compensation during the summer between their second and third semesters. The school offers a flexible schedule option that allows students to extend their study over four semesters or more.

== Student life ==
Multimedia projects and spot news stories appear on the school's NYCity News Service, which runs stories written by students.

The school also produces a student-run TV news magazine show — 219West, which runs on CUNY TV and is named after the building's Manhattan address on West 40th Street — as well as a podcast called AudioFiles.

In addition, students contribute stories to the Bronx-based neighborhood news outlets Mott Haven Herald and Hunts Point Express.

The school has a number of on-campus student organizations and clubs, including the Asian American Journalists Club, Association of Black Journalists, Audiovisual Club, National Association of Hispanic Journalists, Photojournalism Club, Queer Club, and Women in Media.

== Dean Mochkofsky ==
A native of Argentina, Graciela Mochkofsky joined the Newmark J-School in 2016 to launch the nation's first bilingual master's journalism concentration in English and Spanish. Three years later, she added the Center for Community Media (CCM) at the school, which supports news outlets covering immigrants and communities of color across the country.

Under Mochkofsky's leadership, the school trained six cohorts of bilingual journalists. Mochkofsky also led various initiatives focused on Latino media. She also let a project that helped community media outlets receive $25 million in city advertising in the first two years of the COVID-19 pandemic.

She has written for The Paris Review, The Atlantic, and The New Yorker, and authored books covering the relationship between press and political power in Argentina.

== Notable alumni ==
- Kenyon Farrow – Journalist and Activist. Senior Editor of The Body and The Body Pro.
- Adeola Fayehun
- Daisy Rosario
- Tanzina Vega – Formerly host of The Takeaway on WNYC, formerly The New York Times
