= Maria Hinojosa =

Mexican-American journalist (born 1961)

- Hinojosa speaking in 2013
- Born: Maria de Lourdes Hinojosa Ojeda; July 2, 1961 (age 65); Mexico City, Mexico
- Education: Barnard College
- Occupation: Journalist
- Known for: Latino USA
- Spouse: German Pérez
- Awards: John Chancellor Award; Robert F. Kennedy Journalism Award; Edward Murrow Award (Overseas Press Club of America) Pulitzer Prize; Rutgers University Honorary Degree (2022)

Maria de Lourdes Hinojosa Ojeda (born July 2, 1961) is a Mexican-American journalist. She is the anchor and executive producer of Latino USA, a syndicated public radio show devoted to Latino issues. She is also the founder, president and CEO of Futuro Media Group, which produces the show. In 2022, Hinojosa won a Pulitzer Prize.

Additionally, she serves as the executive producer of America By the Numbers with Maria Hinojosa: Clarkston Georgia which premiered on PBS as a Need to Know Election 2012 special on September 21, 2012. In 2011, she became the first Latina to anchor a Frontline report on PBS (Lost in Detention, a documentary exploring the issue of deportation and immigrant detention and abuse). Since 1995, she has been named three times as one of the 100 Most Influential Hispanics by Hispanic Business magazine for her work as a reporter for CBS, NPR, and CNN.

== Career ==
In 1992, Hinojosa helped launch Latino USA, one of the earliest public radio programs devoted to the Latino community. She has been the host of the show for its entire 30-year run, and since 2000 has also been executive producer.

In 2010, Hinojosa founded Futuro Media Group with the mission to produce multi-platform, community-based journalism that respects and celebrates the cultural richness of the American experience. Futuro took over the production of Latino USA, which was originally produced by KUT in Austin, Texas. America by The Numbers with Maria Hinojosa: Clarkston Georgia is the first full-length television program to be produced by The Futuro Media Group and the first public affairs program on PBS to be executive produced and anchored by a Latina woman.

Previously, Hinojosa worked for CNN's New York City bureau for eight years, where she reported on urban issues including youth violence and immigrant communities; and she was Senior Correspondent for the PBS news magazine, NOW on PBS. She also hosted the WNBC-TV public affairs show, Visiones.

Hinojosa hosted her own show for five years on PBS, Maria Hinojosa: One-on-One, an interview talk show that featured one-on-one interviews with a diverse group of guests, including actors, writers, activists, and politicians. She has also appeared on V-me, the Spanish-language TV network, where she hosted La Plaza: Conversaciones con María Hinojosa.

Hinojosa has written three books: Raising Raul: Adventures Raising Myself and My Son, a motherhood memoir; Crews: Gang Members Talk with Maria Hinojosa, a collection of interviews with gang members in New York City; and Once I Was You: A Memoir of Love and Hate in a Torn America, her experience growing up Mexican American on the South Side of Chicago and as an adult witness to the US immigration crisis.

In addition, she interviewed various notable Latinos(as) for Timothy Greenfield-Sanders' 2011 HBO television special The Latino List. The special inspired the publication of a photo book, The Latino List/La Lista De Latinos, co-authored by Hinojosa that includes transcriptions of their interviews. The Latino List: Volume Two premieres on HBO on September 24, 2012. Hinojosa began hosting the National Public Radio show Latino USA in 1995 and continues to host today. Latino USA is produced exclusively by The Futuro Media Group.

Hinojosa's first journalism experience was as host of a Latino radio show while she was a student at Barnard College, where she graduated magna cum laude with a degree in Latin American studies in 1985.

Hinojosa has a cameo in 2021's In the Heights film, playing the part of a protest leader at a DREAMer immigration rally.

== Personal life ==
Maria Hinojosa was born in Mexico City, the daughter of Berta Maria Ojeda Y de Teresa and Dr. Raul Efren Hinojosa Prieto. She moved with her family to the Chicago neighborhood of Hyde Park in 1962 after her father was appointed to the surgical faculty at the University of Chicago. She currently lives in Bethlehem, Connecticut with her husband, the Dominican painter German Pérez, and their adult son and daughter. She also has an apartment in Harlem.

In a 2021 episode of the PBS series Finding Your Roots, Hinojosa learned that her 11th great-grandfather on her father's side was Diego de Montemayor, a Spanish conquistador and the founder of the Mexican city of Monterrey, and that her third great-grandparents on her mother's side, who lived in Cuba, were members of the Spanish nobility. It was also found that her direct matrilineal line is indigenous Mexican.

== Honors and awards ==
Hinojosa has won numerous honors and awards for her work, most recently the 2012 John Chancellor Award for Excellence in Journalism. Other recognition includes the Robert F. Kennedy Journalism Award for Reporting on the Disadvantaged, the National Association of Hispanic Journalists' Radio Award, the New York Society of Professional Journalists Deadline Award, the Studs Terkel Community Media Award, the Edward R. Murrow Award from the Overseas Press Club, the Sidney Hillman Prize, the National Council of La Raza's Rubén Salazar Communications Award (named for Mexican American journalist Rubén Salazar), and an Associated Press award.

In 2010, she received an honorary Doctorate of Humane Letters from DePaul University in Chicago. In 2012, she was named DePaul University's new Sor Juana Inés de la Cruz Chair. In 2022, Rutgers University-Newark gave an honorary degree to Hinojosa. Knox College (Illinois) presented her with an honorary Doctorate of Humane Letters in 2024.

She has won four Emmy Awards, including one in 2002 for coverage of the Sept. 11, 2001 terrorist attacks and another in 2008 for her work on Taxing the Poor, documenting the plight of the lower class in Alabama. In 2009, she was honored with an American Women in Radio and Television (AWRT) Gracie Award for Individual Achievement. Hinojosa has been named among the top 25 Latinos in Contemporary American Culture by the Huffington Post.

Maria Hinojosa: One-on-One was recognized with New England Emmy Awards for Outstanding Interview Program in 2008 and 2011, and a New England Emmy Award for Outstanding Host/Moderator in 2012. In 2011, One-on-One received an Imagen Award for its contribution to the positive image of Latinos in the US.

In 2007, she was inducted into the "She Made It" Hall of Fame at the Paley Center for Media/Museum of Television and Radio.

In 2022, the Pulitzer Prize Board announced that Futuro Media and Hinojosa won a Pulitzer Prize in audio reporting for its seven-part podcast series, Suave, about David Luis Gonzalez.

== Books ==
- Once I Was You: A Memoir (ISBN 9781982128661)
- Raising Raul: Adventures Raising Myself and My Son (ISBN 0140296360)
- Crews: Gang Members Talk with Maria Hinojosa (ISBN 0152002839)
- The Latino List/La Lista De Latinos (ISBN 0983303304)
