= Ayo Maff =

Nigerian singer and songwriter (born 2005)

- Also known as: Prince Of The Street
- Born: Ayorinde Mafoluku Ayodele; 18 July 2005 (age 21); Lagos State, Nigeria
- Genres: Afrobeats; dancehall; afro pop
- Occupations: Singer; songwriter
- Instrument: Vocals
- Works: Discography
- Years active: 2023–present
- Label: Empire

Ayorinde Mafoluku Ayodele (born 18 July 2005), known professionally as Ayo Maff, is a Nigerian singer and songwriter. He gained recognition after releasing the Fireboy DML-assisted single "Dealer", which topped various music charts. His debut extended play (EP), Maffian, was released on 15 August 2024.

== Early life and education ==
Ayorinde Mafoluku Ayodele was born and raised in Somolu, Bariga, Lagos State, Nigeria. He received his education in the same locality. Ayodele's interest in music began at a young age, with his surroundings being cited as an influence.

== Career ==
Ayo Maff released his debut single "Jama Jama" in 2023. He subsequently released a two-track project, STREET ANTHEM / 7 DAYS, in January 2024. Ayo Maff gained widespread recognition after collaborating with Fireboy DML on the single "Dealer". The song's music video, released in April 2024, has garnered over 2.5 million views on YouTube as of February 2025. On 15 August 2024, Ayo Maff released his debut extended play, Maffian, a seven-track project that includes the single "Last Week".

== Discography ==
=== Studio albums ===
- Prince of the Street (2025)

=== Extended plays ===
- Maffian (2024)

=== Singles ===
List of singles
Title	Year
"Jama Jama"	2023
"Jama Jama" (Remix) (with Diamond Jimma)	2023
"Another Day"	2023
"Journey"	2023
"Saturday Night"	2023
"7 Days"	2024
"Street Anthem"	2024
"Dealer" (with Fireboy DML)	2024
"Last Week"	2024
