= Ogechi Adeola =

Nigerian business studies academic

- Occupation: Business academic

Academic background
- Education: University of Nigeria; Manchester Business School

Academic work
- Institutions: Lagos Business School; University of the People; University of Kigali

Ogechi Adeola is a Nigerian business studies academic. She is the associate dean of business administration at the University of the People and associate professor of marketing at the Lagos Business School. In January 2024, she was elected the Deputy Vice Chancellor of University of Kigali, Rwanda.

== Life ==
She completed an MBA and Doctor of Business Administration at Manchester Business School.

Adeola is an associate professor of marketing and heads the department of operations, marketing, and information systems at Lagos Business School. She is the associate dean of business administration at University of the People. In February 2021, Adeola was named the independent non-executive director of Cornerstone Insurance Plc.

Adeola is a fellow of the Institute of Strategic Management, Nigeria and the National Institute of Marketing of Nigeria. Adeola is also an author and also an associate professor of marketing at the Lagos business school. In 2016 and 2017, Adeola ogechi published academic papers in scholarly journals where she won Best Paper Awards at international conferences. She’s also the founder of Business Tutelage for women Empowerment in Africa initiative.

She was appointed the Deputy Vice Chancellor - Academics at the University of Kigali, Rwanda by the officiating body on the 11th of January, 2024.

== Selected works ==
- Hinson, Robert Ebo; Aziato, Lydia; Adeola, Ogechi; Osei-Frimpong, Kofi, eds. (2019). Health Service Marketing Management in Africa. Routledge, Taylor & Francis Group. ISBN 978-0-367-00193-3.
- Hinson, Robert Ebo; Adeola, Ogechi; Lituchy, Terri; Amartey, Abednego Feehi Okoe, eds. (2020). Customer Service Management in Africa: A Strategic and Operational Perspective. CRC Press. ISBN 978-0-429-63194-8.
- Adeola, Ogechi, ed. (2020). Indigenous African Enterprise: The Igbo Traditional Business School (I-TBS). Emerald Group Publishing. ISBN 978-1-83909-033-2.
- Adeola, Ogechi, ed. (2020). Empowering African Women for Sustainable Development: Toward Achieving the United Nations' 2030 Goals. Springer International Publishing. ISBN 978-3-030-59101-4.
- Ngoasong, Michael Z.; Adeola, Ogechi; Kimbu, Albert N.; Hinson, Robert E., eds. (2021). New Frontiers in Hospitality and Tourism Management in Africa. Springer International Publishing. ISBN 978-3-030-70170-3.
- Adeola, Ogechi; Robert E., Hinson; A. M., Sakkthivel, eds. (2022). Marketing Communications and Brand Development in Emerging Economies Volume I: Contemporary and Future Perspectives. Springer International Publishing. ISBN 978-3-030-88677-6.
