= Qing Madi =

Nigerian singer and songwriter (born 2006)

- Born: Chimamanda Pearl Chukwuma; 1 July 2006 (age 20); Benin City, Edo, Nigeria
- Origin: Delta State, Nigeria
- Genres: Afrobeats; pop; soul; R&B; alté
- Occupations: Singer; songwriter
- Instruments: Vocals; piano; keyboard; drum machine
- Years active: 2022–present
- Label: JTON Music
- Website: qingmadi.com

YouTube information
- Channel: Qing Madi
- Subscribers: 376 thousand
- Views: 175.53 million
- Last updated: 6 June 2026

Chimamanda Pearl Chukwuma (born 1 July 2006), professionally known as Qing Madi (/kɪŋ ˈmɑːdi/), is a Nigerian singer, songwriter and dancer. She gained widespread recognition after her 2022 single "See Finish" and its 2023 follow-up, "Ole" featuring Bnxn. Both went viral on TikTok, and later peaked at number one and number three on the Uganda Top 100 Apple Music chart. Both songs were released as singles from Madi's debut extended play, Qing Madi (2023).

== Early life and education ==
Chimamanda Pearl Chukwuma was born and raised in Benin City along with her siblings by her mother and attended Negbenegbor International School in Benin City but she hails from Delta State. She began performing at a young age, participating in school talent shows and singing in her church's adult choir.

== Career ==
On October 14, 2022, Qing Madi released her breakout single "See Finish", which made its breakthrough primarily on TikTok. Sooner, she released three additional singles; gaining her more recognition, and performed at the Homecoming event in Lagos, Nigeria. Qing Madi's music genres have been noted as Afrobeat, Pop, Soul, and R&B.

In 2023, Qing Madi was chosen as the Spotify Africa Equal Ambassador for the month of June. On July 21, 2023, Qing Madi released the single "Ole" featuring BNXN.

The song made entry to multiple Apple Music charts and peaked at number 12 on the TurnTable Top 100. "Ole" made its entry into the Official Afrobeats Chart, peaking at number 16 in August. In November 2023, she released a seven-track self-titled EP that collected most of her recordings thus far.

In January 2024, alongside OdumoduBlvck, Bloody Civilian, and Tyla, Qing Madi was inducted into Apple Music's Rising Class of 2024. In an interview with African Folder, Madi said that she wrote two songs for her debut eponymous project when she was fourteen.

As of early June 2026, there was a dispute between the Afrobeats singer and her former label JTon Music, founded by Joy Tongo. She signed with JTon Music, as a minor, reportedly around the age of 16. According to her own public statements, her mother also signed the contract because she was underage at the time. Under JTon Music, Madi released tracks including Ole and American Love. JTon has publicly cited each as having surpassed 100 million streams on Spotify, framing the figures as evidence of its investment in her career. Madi has since exited the label and launched her own imprint, KFMD, under which she released her most recent titled EP Barely Legal. JTon Music, through Joy Tongo, filed a breach-of-contract suit against Madi following her departure from the label. According to JTon, the action relates to her exit and to subsequent releases issued without settling outstanding contractual obligations and recouping the label's prior investment. The damages sought have been reported variously as $1 million and $2 million across different outlets; Madi has publicly described it as a $2 million claim.

== Awards and nominations ==
Year	Awards ceremony	Award description(s)	Nominated work	Results	Ref
2025	The Headies	Songwriter of the Year	ChimAmanda Pearl Chukwuma - "Vision" (Qing Madi)	Won	

== Discography ==
=== Studio albums ===
List of Albums, with selected details
Title	EP details
I am the Blueprint	Released: January 31, 2025; Label: JTON Music; Format: Digital download

=== Extended plays ===
List of EPs, with selected details
Title	EP details
Qing Madi	Released: November 17, 2023; Label: JTON Music; Format: Digital download

=== Singles ===
- "See Finish" (2022)
- "Why" (2023)
- "Ole (featuring Bnxn)" (2023)
- “American Love” (2023)
- "Ego" (2025)
