= Aderonke Adeola =

Nigerian film Director

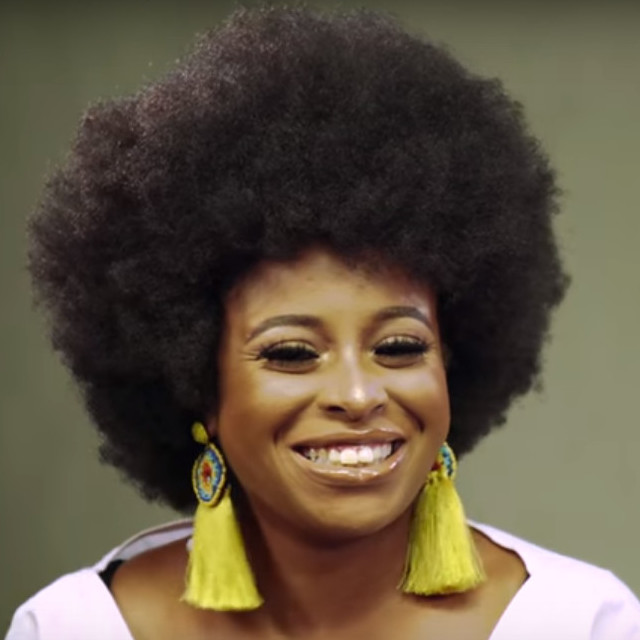
- Born: Aderonke Adeola; Lagos, Nigeria
- Education: Graduate of art history
- Occupations: Nigerian Director and Producer

Aderonke Adeola is a Nigerian film director, art historian, fashion entrepreneur, script-writer and producer. She won the UNESCO prize at the 2019 African Film Festival for her documentary Awani. She is also a freelance writer for The Guardian and ThisDay newspapers.

== Career ==
Adeola is a graduate of Art history. She has previously worked at the Marketing and Communications at Stanbic IBTC and was also an associate Producer at RED TV before going into documentary film making. She was an assistant producer on the creation of the novel Half of a Yellow Sun which was adapted into a movie. She directed her first documentary film Awani which won her the UNESCO Prize at the 2019 African Film Festival and an award of merit at the 2019 Impact documentary Awards.
