= KUTX =

Radio station in Austin, Texas

Coordinates: 30.391°N 97.837°W

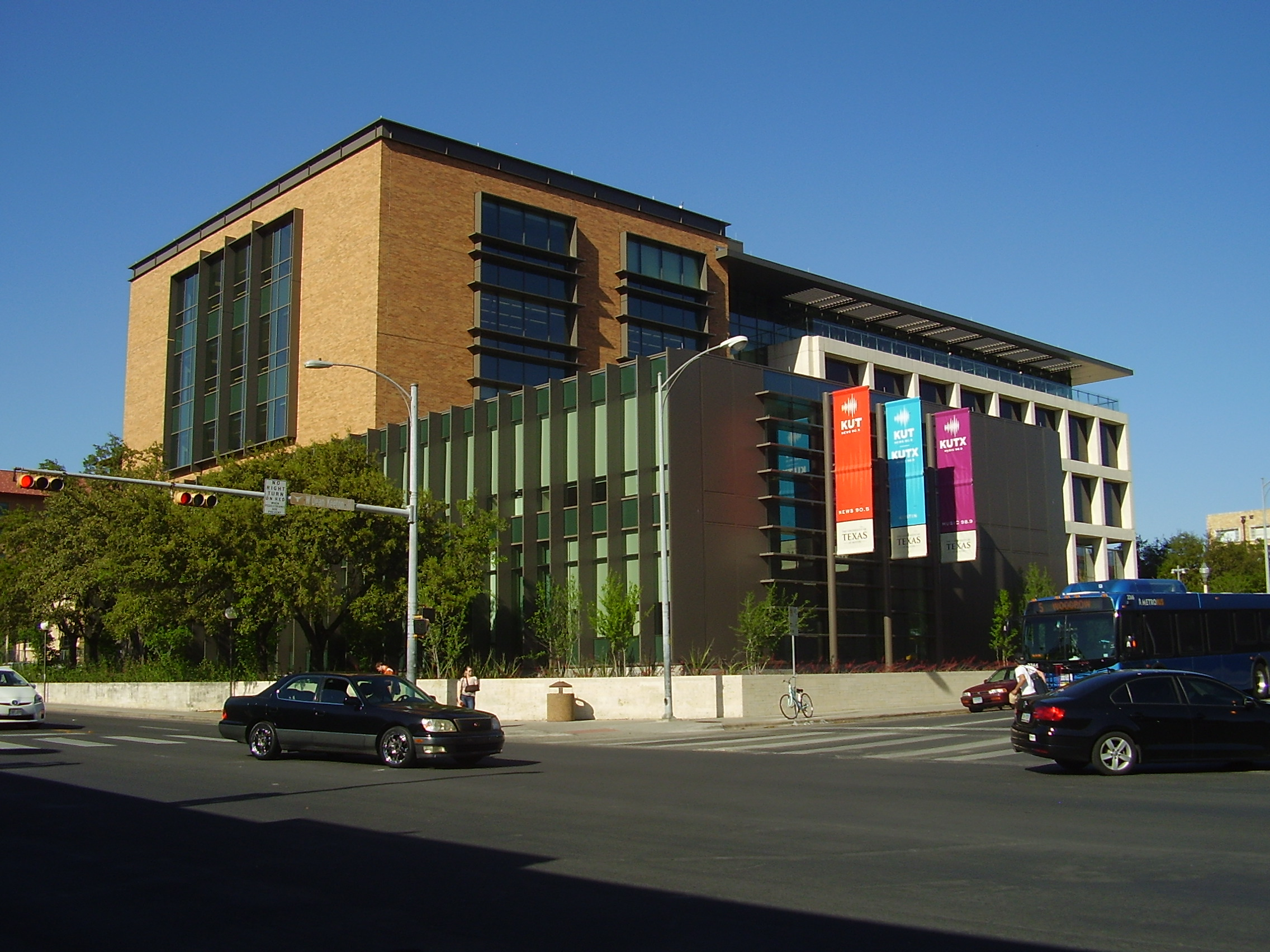
- Belo Center for New Media - KUTX / KUT offices
- Leander, Texas; United States
- Broadcast area: Austin-Round Rock metropolitan area
- Frequency: 98.9 MHz (HD Radio)
- Branding: KUTX 98.9

Programming
- Format: Adult album alternative (Public)
- Affiliations: NPR

Ownership
- Owner: The University of Texas at Austin
- Sister stations: KUT, KVRX

History
- First air date: 1988; 38 years ago
- Former call signs: KLTD (1988–1993); KUTZ (1993–1996); KJFK (1996–2000); KHHL (2000–2009); KXBT (2009–2013)
- Call sign meaning: University of Texas

Technical information
- Licensing authority: FCC
- Facility ID: 59982
- Class: C3
- ERP: 1,600 watts
- HAAT: 390 meters (1,280 ft)

Links
- Public license information: Public file; LMS
- Webcast: Listen live
- Website: kutx.org; amx.fm (HD2); tmx.fm (HD3)

KUTX (98.9 FM) is a non-commercial radio station licensed to Leander, Texas and serving the greater Austin, Texas area with an adult album alternative format. The station is owned by University of Texas at Austin with headquarters at the Belo Center for New Media (A0704) on the University of Texas at Austin campus on West Dean Keaton Street.

== History ==
98.9 signed on in 1988 on 99.1 MHz as KLTD, "Kool 99 FM" with the Satellite Music Network's "Kool Gold" format by Adams Broadcasting, which eventually spun off the Kool Gold format to Dial Global. On July 3, 1993, KLTD changed calls to KUTZ and format to hard rock as part of the Satellite Music Network-Z Rock Network.

In 1996, 98.9 FM changed to news/talk as KJFK, which lasted until September 2000 when Border Media Partners acquired the station and changed formats to Rock AC as "The Hill", KHHL."KHHL The Hill Automated No Spots 9 12 00 Unscoped". Later, 98.9 FM became Spanish CHR, "Exitos 98.9", and then "La Ley 98.9" with a Regional Mexican format.

The Regional Mexican format lasted until November 29, 2009, when Bain Capital took over most of the assets of the Austin, Texas cluster of Border Media Partners, and KHHL changed formats to talk radio as "98.9 The Big Talker" and the station adopted a new callsign, KXBT.

As "98.9 The Big Talker", the station's weekday line-up included The Sean Rima Show during morning rush hour/drive time hours, The Glenn Beck Program during late-morning and early-afternoon hours (often referred to in radio station lingo as the Rush Limbaugh time slot), The Dave Ramsey Show during mid-afternoon hours, "Tabu" (a male-oriented sex and relationships show) Saturdays and Sundays 9pm-Midnight with Rachael Wax, The Schnitt Show during late-afternoon hours, and The Mark Levin Show during late-rush hour and early-evening hours. The weekends included The Jesus Christ Show, The Otherside with Steve Godfrey, Leo Laporte The Tech Guy, John Clay Wolfe, and The Weekend. The station was also the Houston Texans affiliate for the Austin, Texas market.

On August 15, 2011, after a listener survey and facing stagnant ratings, BMP Radio dropped the news/talk format in favor of Classic Hits. From August 15, 2011, to September 3, 2011, KXBT simulcasted KXXS ("True Oldies 92.5"). The True Oldies Channel programming moved permanently to 98.9 FM on September 3 as "98.9 Austin's Greatest Hits", and KXXS dropped the oldies format in favor of ESPN Deportes, formerly located on KWNX.

As of January 23, 2012, KXBT began airing local programming Monday-Friday 6am-7pm and added a local morning show from 6am-10am with Bo Chase in the Morning as well as syndicated host Tom Kent weekdays from 7pm-12am. Scott Shannon's satellite-fed True Oldies Channel continued to air overnights and Sundays at 7 pm. On Saturdays, KXBT aired Saturday Night Dance Fever live at the Iron Cactus North on Stonelake Boulevard in Austin. The program featured dance classics of the 1970s, 1980s, and early-1990s.

On July 7, 2012, as part of Border Media's Austin selloff, the Board of Regents at the University of Texas announced their intention to vote on their acquisition of KXBT for $6 million; while questions about the proposal tabled the vote for some time, it was approved on August 23, and UT shortly after announced their intention to move KUT's music programming to 98.9 under new calls KUTX by the start of 2013. On November 26, KXBT announced that their classic hits format would end the following Friday, the 30th. At 2 p.m. that day, Austin's Greatest Hits signed off with Don McLean's "American Pie", and 98.9 began playing Christmas music while promoting the upcoming launch of KUTX, starting with "Here Comes Santa Claus" by Elvis Presley from the 1957 album Elvis' Christmas Album. On December 26, at Midnight, after playing "Rudolph the Red-Nosed Reindeer" by Burl Ives & the Videocraft Chorus, 98.9, finishing out the entire soundtrack to the television special of the same name, began its "Music Preview", with the first song as KUTX being "We Can Work It Out" by The Beatles. The jockless preview gave way to the fully staffed version of the format on January 2. KUTX is marketed as "The Austin Music Experience." Music shows moved from KUT include Eklektikos, hosted by John Aielli (with KUT since 1966); Left of the Dial with Jeff McCord; and shows hosted by Jay Trachtenberg, and Jody Denberg. Specialty shows based at KUTX include Global Grooves (world music), Horizontes (Latin American music), Soundfounder (electronic music), and Spare the Rock, Spoil the Child (family music).
