= Wizard Chan =

Nigerian hip-hop singer

- Born: Fuayefika Maxwell Port Harcourt, Rivers State, Nigeria
- Genres: Hip-hop; afropop
- Occupations: Singer; Songwriter
- Instruments: Vocals; piano
- Years active: 2020–present
- Label: Chan Empire

Fuayefika Maxwell (born 26, June) known professionally as Wizard Chan is a Nigerian Afro-Teme and reggae singer, songwriter and music producer. He released his first official single titled 'Halo Halo' in 2020. However, he rose to limelight with the hit single ‘Earth Song’ which was released in December 2022. In 2023, he won awards at The Headies and the Galaxy Music Awards.

== Early life ==
Maxwell was born on 26 June in Okrika, Rivers State, to the family of Chief & Mrs Fuayefika, as the last of five children. He is an indigene of Port Harcourt, and also spent most of his childhood there. He acquired his secondary education from De World International Secondary School, Rivers State. He graduated from Wisconsin International University College in Accra, Ghana where he studied Marketing. He returned to Nigeria after graduation and went to Sokoto for his NYSC.

== Music career ==
Maxwell started writing songs as a child. He was a member of the choir and recorded his first unofficial song in December 2011 after his secondary education . With time, he started by making covers of various hit songs and posting it on social media platforms.

In 2020, he officially started his music career by debuting his first single titled ‘Halo Halo’. In October 2020, he released another single ‘Truth’. However, he did not gain much recognition until December 2022 when he released the single titled ‘Earth Song’. The song gained him popularity and climbed the charts as one of the Top 20 Songs in Nigeria on Apple Music.

== Discography ==
=== Singles ===
- Halo Halo
- Truth
- Y.O.L.O
- Miss You -- Thousand Voice ft Wizard Chan (2022)
- Earth Song
- Highlife
- Moses ft Boma Nime
- Drumline -- 01FRNCH ft Wizard Chan
- Beast of Our nation -- King Perryy ft Wizard Chan & Tuzi

== Awards and nominations ==
Year	Award	Category	Nominee	Result	Ref
2023	The Headies	Best Alternative Song of the year	Earth song	Won	
2023	The Headies	Best Songwriter of the Year	Himself	Nominated	
2023	Galaxy Music Awards	Best Alternative Song of the year	Earth song	Won	
