= Asake discography =

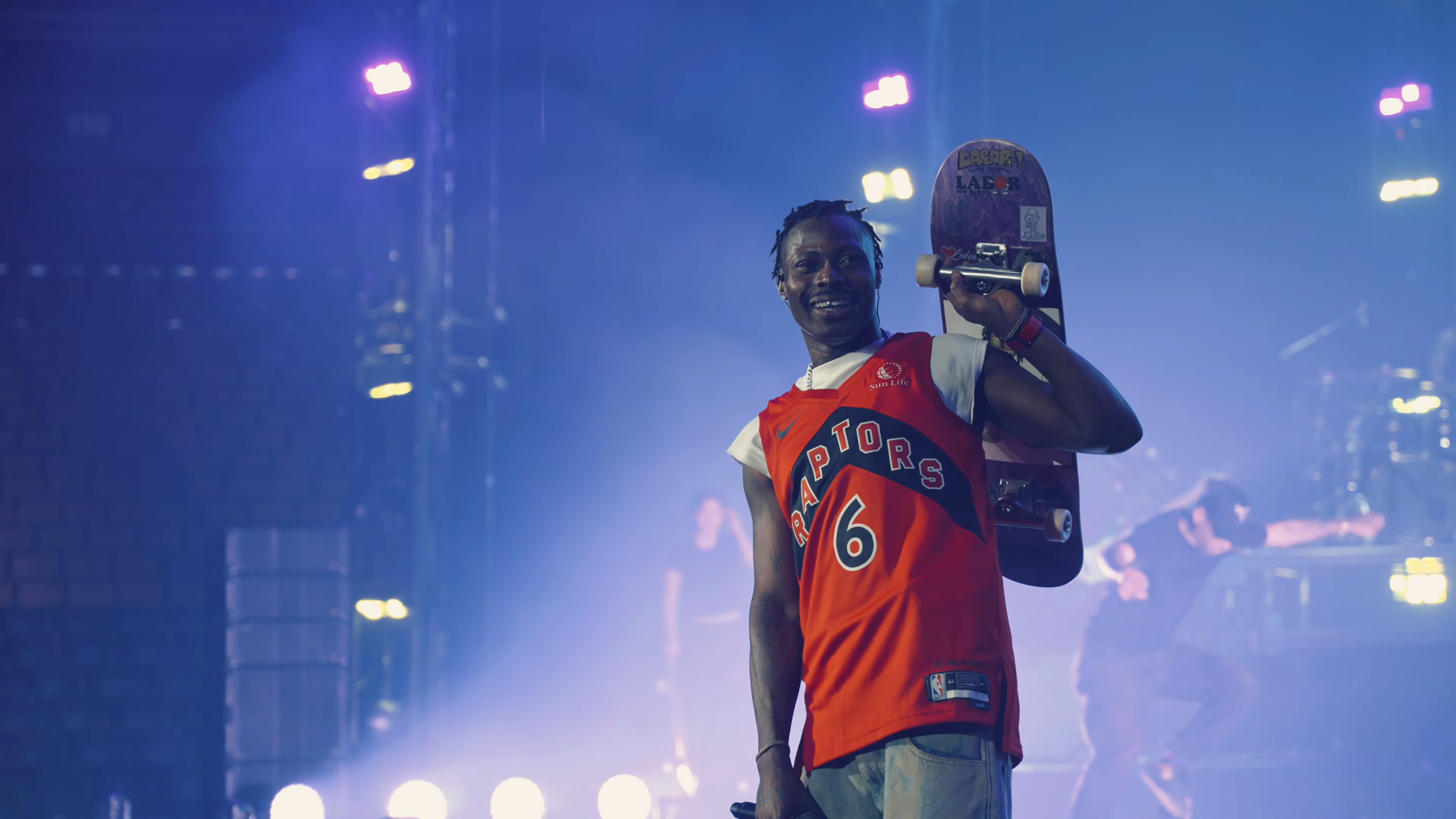
- Asake performing in Toronto
- Studio albums: 3
- EPs: 2
- Singles: 23
- Music videos: 13
- Promotional singles: 4

The discography of Nigeria singer Asake consists of 3 studio albums, 23 singles (including 3 as a featured artist), 4 promotional singles, and 15 music videos.

== Studio albums ==
| Title | Album details | Peak chart positions | | | | | Certifications |
| Title | Album details | NGR | CAN | IRE | UK | US | Certifications |
|---|---|---|---|---|---|---|---|
| Mr. Money with the Vibe | Released: 7 September 2022; Label: YBNL Nation, Empire; Formats: Digital download, streaming | 1 | — | 27 | 22 | 66 | TCSN:4× Platinum; BPI: Gold |
| Work of Art | Released: 16 June 2023; Label: YNBL, Empire; Formats: Digital download, streaming | 1 | — | 59 | 20 | 66 | BPI: Silver |
| Lungu Boy | Released: 9 August 2024; Label: YNBL, Empire; Formats: Digital download, streaming | 1 | 54 | 42 | 15 | 115 | |
| M$ney | Released: 1 May 2026; Label: Giran Republic, Empire; Formats: Digital download, streaming | 1 | 69 | 58 | 27 | — | |
"—" denotes a title that did not chart, or was not released in that territory.

== Extended plays ==
| Title | EP details |
|---|---|
| Ololade | Released: 16 February 2022; Label: YBNL Nation, Empire; Format: Digital download, streaming |
| Real, Vol. 1 (with Wizkid) | Released: 23 January 2026; Label: Starboy, Giran Republic, Empire; Format: Digital download, streaming |

== Singles ==
=== As lead artist ===
List of singles as lead artist, with selected chart positions and certifications
| Title | Year | Peak chart positions | | | | | | | | | Certification | Album |
| Title | Year | NGR | CAN | FRA | IRE | NZ Hot | UK | UK Afro | US Afro | WW | Certification | Album |
|---|---|---|---|---|---|---|---|---|---|---|---|---|
| "Sungba" (Solo or with Burna Boy) | 2022 | 15 | — | — | — | — | — | 2 | — | — | TCSN:4× Platinum; BPI: Silver | Mr. Money with the Vibe |
| "Peace Be Unto You (PBUY)" | 2022 | 1 | — | — | — | — | — | 2 | — | — | TCSN: 4× Platinum | Mr. Money with the Vibe |
| "Bandana" (with Fireboy DML) | 2022 | 1 | — | — | — | — | — | 3 | — | — | TCSN: 6× Platinum; BPI: Silver | Playboy |
| "Terminator" | 2022 | 1 | — | — | 91 | — | 82 | 2 | 6 | 172 | TCSN: 6× Platinum; BPI: Silver | Mr. Money with the Vibe |
| "Loaded" (with Tiwa Savage) | 2022 | 3 | — | — | — | — | — | 4 | 15 | — | TCSN: Platinum | Where We Come From, Vol. 01 |
| "Yoga" | 2023 | 1 | — | — | — | — | — | 4 | — | — | TCSN: 2× Platinum | Work of Art |
| "2:30" | 2023 | 1 | — | — | — | — | — | 2 | — | — | TCSN: 4× Platinum | Work of Art |
| "Amapiano" (with Olamide) | 2023 | 1 | — | — | — | — | 86 | 3 | — | — | TCSN: 3× Platinum; BPI: Silver | Work of Art |
| "New Religion" (with Olamide) | 2023 | 2 | — | — | — | — | — | — | — | — | TCSN: Platinum | Unruly |
| "Lonely at the Top" (Solo or with H.E.R) | 2023 | 1 | — | — | — | — | 90 | 4 | — | — | TCSN: 7× Platinum; BPI: Silver | Work of Art |
| "Only Me" | 2024 | 3 | — | — | — | — | — | 4 | — | — | TCSN: Platinum | Non-album single |
| "Stubborn" (with Victony) | 2024 | 2 | — | — | — | — | — | — | — | — | TCSN: Platinum | Stubborn |
| "Wave" (with Central Cee) | 2024 | 2 | — | — | 82 | 28 | 41 | 1 | 8 | — | TCSN: 2× Platinum | Lungu Boy |
| "Active" (with Travis Scott) | 2024 | 7 | 95 | — | 88 | 29 | 58 | 1 | 1 | 176 | TCSN: 2× Platinum | Lungu Boy |
| "Why Love" | 2025 | 5 | — | — | — | — | — | 2 | — | — | TCSN: Silver | M$ney |
| "Badman Gangsta" (with Tiakola) | 2025 | 1 | — | 41 | — | — | — | 8 | 7 | — | | M$ney |
| "Worship" (with DJ Snake) | 2026 | 1 | — | — | — | — | — | 1 | 5 | — | | M$ney |
| "Jogodo" (with Wizkid) | 2026 | 1 | — | — | — | — | 74 | — | — | 120 | | Real, Vol. 1 |
| "Turbulence" (with Wizkid) | 2026 | 2 | — | — | — | — | 76 | — | — | 178 | | Real, Vol. 1 |
"—" denotes a title that did not chart, or was not released in that territory.

=== As featured artist ===
List of singles as featuring artist, with selected chart positions
| Title | Year | Peak chart positions | | Album |
| Title | Year | UK Afro | US Afro | Album |
|---|---|---|---|---|
| "Palazzo" (Spinall featuring Asake) | 2022 | 4 | 6 | Top Boy |
| "Happiness" (Sarz featuring Asake and Gunna) | 2023 | 2 | — | Protect Sarz at All Costs |
"—" denotes a title that did not chart.

== Other charted songs ==
List of other charted songs, with selected chart positions
| Title | Year | Peak chart positions | | | | Album |
| Title | Year | NG | UK Afro | UK Indie | US Afro | Album |
|---|---|---|---|---|---|---|
| "Dull" | 2022 | 6 | 7 | — | — | Mr. Money with the Vibe |
| "Joha" | 2022 | 2 | 2 | — | — | Mr. Money with the Vibe |
| "No Competition" (Davido featuring Asake) | 2023 | 1 | 2 | — | — | Timeless |
| "Basquiat" | 2023 | 2 | 5 | — | — | Work of Art |
| "Remember" | 2023 | 21 | 11 | — | — | Work of Art |
| "MMS" (with Wizkid) | 2024 | 1 | 1 | — | — | Lungu Boy |
| "Get it Right" (Tems featuring Asake) | 2024 | 12 | 9 | — | — | Born in the Wild |
| "Gratitude" | 2026 | 1 | 4 | — | 6 | M$ney |
| "Rora" | 2026 | 5 | — | — | 8 | M$ney |
| "Amen" | 2026 | 9 | — | — | 12 | M$ney |
| "Wa" | 2026 | 6 | — | — | 9 | M$ney |
| "MCBH" | 2026 | 4 | — | — | 7 | M$ney |
| "Forgiveness" | 2026 | 1 | 3 | 37 | 5 | M$ney |
| "Oba" | 2026 | 6 | — | — | 11 | M$ney |
| "Asambe" (featuring Kabza de Small) | 2026 | 11 | — | — | 13 | M$ney |
| "Skilful" | 2026 | 14 | — | — | 14 | M$ney |
"—" denotes a title that did not chart, or was not released in that territory.

== Music videos ==
List of music videos as lead and featured artist, showing year released and directors
| Title | Year | Director(s) |
|---|---|---|
| "Omo Ope" (Asake featuring Olamide) | 2022 | Asher Kine |
| "Sungba" (Asake) | 2022 | TG Omori |
| "Sungba Remix" (Asake featuring Burna Boy) | 2022 | TG Omori |
| "Palazzo" (DJ Spinall featuring Asake) | 2022 | TG Omori |
| "Peace Be Unto You" (Asake) | 2022 | TG Omori |
| "Terminator" (Asake) | 2022 | TG Omori |
| "Joha" (Asake) | 2022 | TG Omori |
| "Loaded" (Tiwa Savage featuring Asake) | 2022 | TG Omori |
| "Organise" (Asake) | 2022 | TG Omori |
| "Yoga" | 2023 | TG Omori |
| "2:30" | 2023 | Joshua Valle & Edgar Esteves |
| "Amapiano" (Asake featuring Olamide) | 2023 | Jyde Ajala |
| "Basquiat" | 2023 | Joshua Valle & Edgar Esteves |
| "Remember" | 2023 | Joshua Valle |
