= Jogodo =

2026 single by Wizkid and Asake

Single by Wizkid and Asake

from the album Real, Vol. 1
- Language: English; Yoruba
- Released: 16 January 2026
- Genre: Afrobeats
- Length: 3:08
- Label: Starboy; Giran Republic; Empire
- Songwriters: Ahmed Ololade; Ayodeji Ibrahim Balogun
- Producer: Magicsticks

Wizkid singles chronology
"Dynamite" (2025)	"Jogodo" (2026)	"Turbulence" (2026)

Asake singles chronology
"Why Love" (2025)	"Jogodo" (2026)	"Turbulence" (2026)

Music video
- "Jogodo" on YouTube

"Jogodo" is a song by Nigerian recording artists Wizkid and Asake, released on 16 January 2026. It serves as the lead single from their joint extended play Real, Vol. 1, which was released on 23 January 2026. The song debuted at number one on the Official Nigeria Top 100, where it spent nine consecutive weeks, placing it among the longest-running number one singles in the chart's history. It also charted on the UK Official Singles Chart, peaking at number 73.

== Background ==
Wizkid and Asake had previously collaborated on two occasions prior to the release of "Jogodo". Asake featured on "MMS", a track from Asake's debut album Lungu Boy, while Wizkid featured Asake on "Bad Girl", included on his 2024 project Morayo.Interest in the joint project was confirmed publicly in early December 2025, when both artists appeared together in an Apple Music Radio interview during which Wizkid announced that a collaborative extended play titled Real was in preparation. Nigerian-American DJ Michael Adeyinka, known as DJ Tunez, subsequently posted a short audio excerpt from one of the project's tracks on his social media account, drawing further attention to the forthcoming release.

== Composition ==
The song is sung primarily in a combination of Yoruba and Nigerian Pidgin. Music in Africa described the production as featuring prominent percussion and brass elements within an Afrobeats framework, with Wizkid and Asake alternating verses in what the publication characterised as a measured vocal exchange. Premium Times described the lyrical content as centred on attraction, desire, and lifestyle, and noted that Wizkid delivered what the review characterised as clean, steady vocals while Asake incorporated local dialect. BusinessDay described the song's title as derived from a term for intoxication or being under the influence, a theme reflected in the song's lyrics and production.

== Release ==
The song was released on 16 January 2026 as the lead single from the joint extended play Real, Vol. 1. The EP, which comprised four tracks — "Jogodo", "Turbulence", "Iskolodo", and "Alaye" — was subsequently released on 23 January 2026.

== Commercial performance ==
=== Nigeria ===
"Jogodo" debuted at number one on the Official Nigeria Top 100 singles chart, a chart compiled on the basis of audio and video streaming data combined with radio airplay within Nigeria. The song remained at number one for nine consecutive weeks as of the chart dated 24 March 2026, placing it fifth on the list of longest-running number one singles in the chart's history, behind Asake's "Lonely at the Top" (thirteen weeks), Omah Lay's "Godly" and Kizz Daniel and Davido's "Twe Twe" (eleven weeks each), and Joeboy's "Sip (Alcohol)" (ten weeks).Premium Times reported that the song debuted at number one on Spotify Nigeria with 1.388 million streams on its first day, which the publication described as a national record for a collaborative release. BusinessDay reported that the song accumulated 6.632 million streams on Spotify Nigeria in its first week, which it described as a record for first-week performance on the platform in Nigeria. HipTV reported that the song also reached number one on Apple Music Nigeria, Audiomack, YouTube, Deezer, and Shazam in Nigeria following its release.All four tracks from Real, Vol. 1 entered the Official Nigeria Top 100 top five simultaneously upon the EP's release, which Turntable Charts described as the first instance of a project placing all its tracks in the top five of the official singles chart in Nigeria. The EP's combined first-week on-demand stream total of 25.7 million was reported by Turntable Charts as the largest debut by an extended play in Nigeria, surpassing the previous record held by Seyi Vibez's Children of Africa.

=== United Kingdom ===
"Jogodo" entered the UK Official Singles Chart on 29 January 2026 and peaked at number 73, spending two weeks on the chart. The song was released on the EMPIRE label.

== Critical reception ==
Premium Times awarded the song a rating of 7 out of 10, describing it as a catchy and replayable track that successfully combined the two artists' contrasting styles. The review noted that while the song functioned effectively as a commercial release, its lyrical content offered limited emotional or thematic depth beyond sensuality and lifestyle themes.

== Charts ==
Chart (2026)	Peak position
Global 200 (Billboard)	120
Global Excl. US (Billboard)	75
Nigeria (TurnTable Top 100)	1
US Billboard Afrobeats Songs (Billboard)	4
UK Singles (Official Charts)	73
Official Singles Chart Update	56
UK Indie (Official Charts)	21
UK Hip Hop/R&B (Official Charts)	29
UK Afrobeats (Official Charts)	1

== Release history ==
Release dates and formats for "Jogodo"
Region	Date	Format	Label	Ref.
Various	16 January 2026	Digital download; Streaming	Starboy; Giran Republic; Empire	
