= List of number-one songs of 2023 (Nigeria) =

The TurnTable Top 100 (formerly known as TurnTable Top 50) is the official music chart for Nigeria, published weekly by TurnTable magazine. The chart ranks the most popular songs in the country based on a combination of streaming and airplay data. Streaming accounts for 50% of the chart, sourced from platforms including Apple Music, Spotify, Boomplay, Audiomack, YouTube, and Deezer, with paid streams weighted more heavily than ad-supported streams. Airplay, which also accounts for 50% of the chart, is tracked via Radiomonitor and includes both radio and television plays across Nigeria. "Lonely at the Top" by Asake is the year's longest-running number-one song in 2023, having spent a total of thirteen non-consecutive weeks at the top spot across two separate runs. Asake dominated the Nigerian charts throughout the year, achieving four different number-one songs including "Yoga", "2:30", "Amapiano" (with Olamide), and "Lonely at the Top", the most by any artist in 2023.

The year began with Ruger's "Asiwaju" holding the top position for four consecutive weeks in January. Early 2023 saw collaborative success, with "Gwagwalada" by Bnxn, Kizz Daniel, and Seyi Vibez spending four weeks at number one, marking one of the year's most successful multi-artist collaborations. Ayra Starr, who previously became the first female artist to reach number one with a solo song ("Bloody Samaritan" in 2021), returned to the top spot in 2023 with "Sability", making her the only solo female artist to achieve a number-one hit during the year. The late MohBad achieved a posthumous number-one hit with "Ask About Me" in late September, following his untimely death earlier that month. Amapiano-influenced tracks like Asake and Olamide's "Amapiano" and KCee's "Ojapiano" also made impact on the charts. The year concluded with Kizz Daniel's "Twe Twe" holding the number-one position, closing out a year that saw fifteen different songs reach the top spot.

== Chart history ==
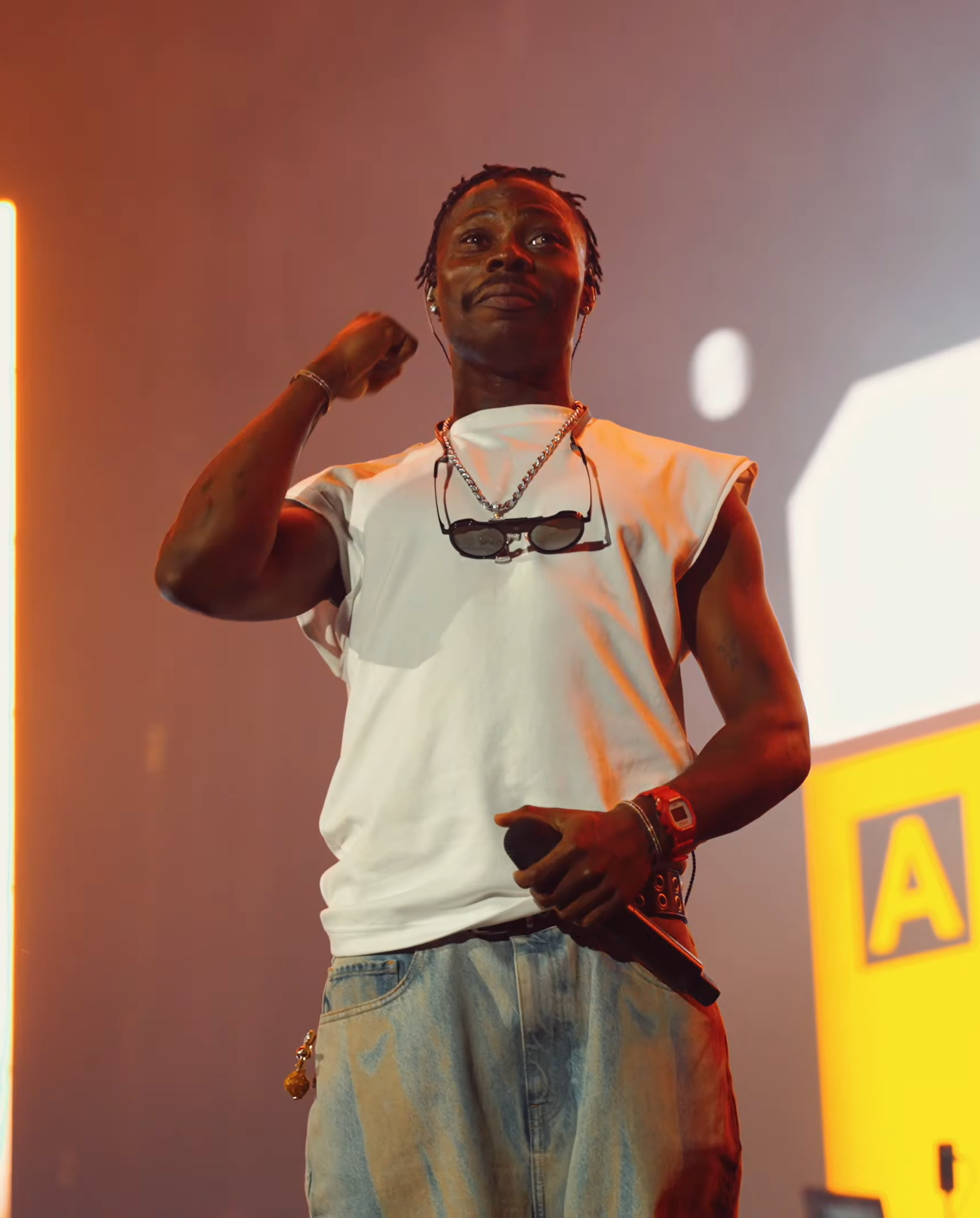
Asake (pictured) topped the chart for Twenty-two weeks with the Davido collaboration "No Competition", with the Olamide Collaboration Amapiano and his singles "Lonely at the Top", Yoga, and 2:30.

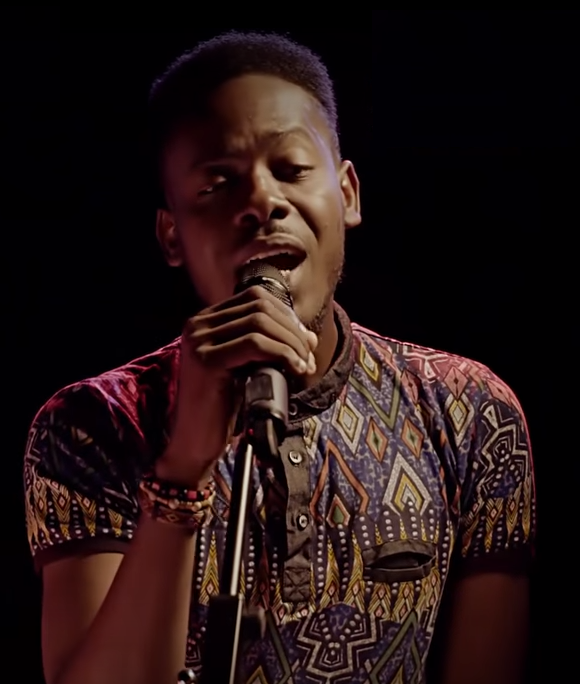
Adekunle Gold (pictured) earned his first number-one single in Nigeria with "Party No Dey Stop".

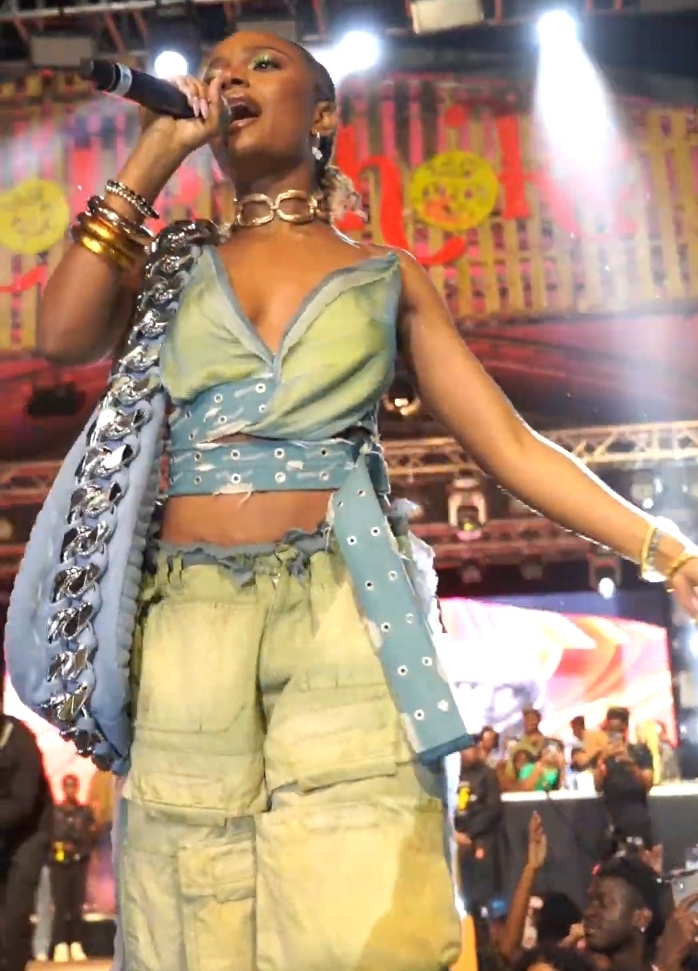
Ayra Starr (pictured) scored her third solo number-one hit with "Sability".

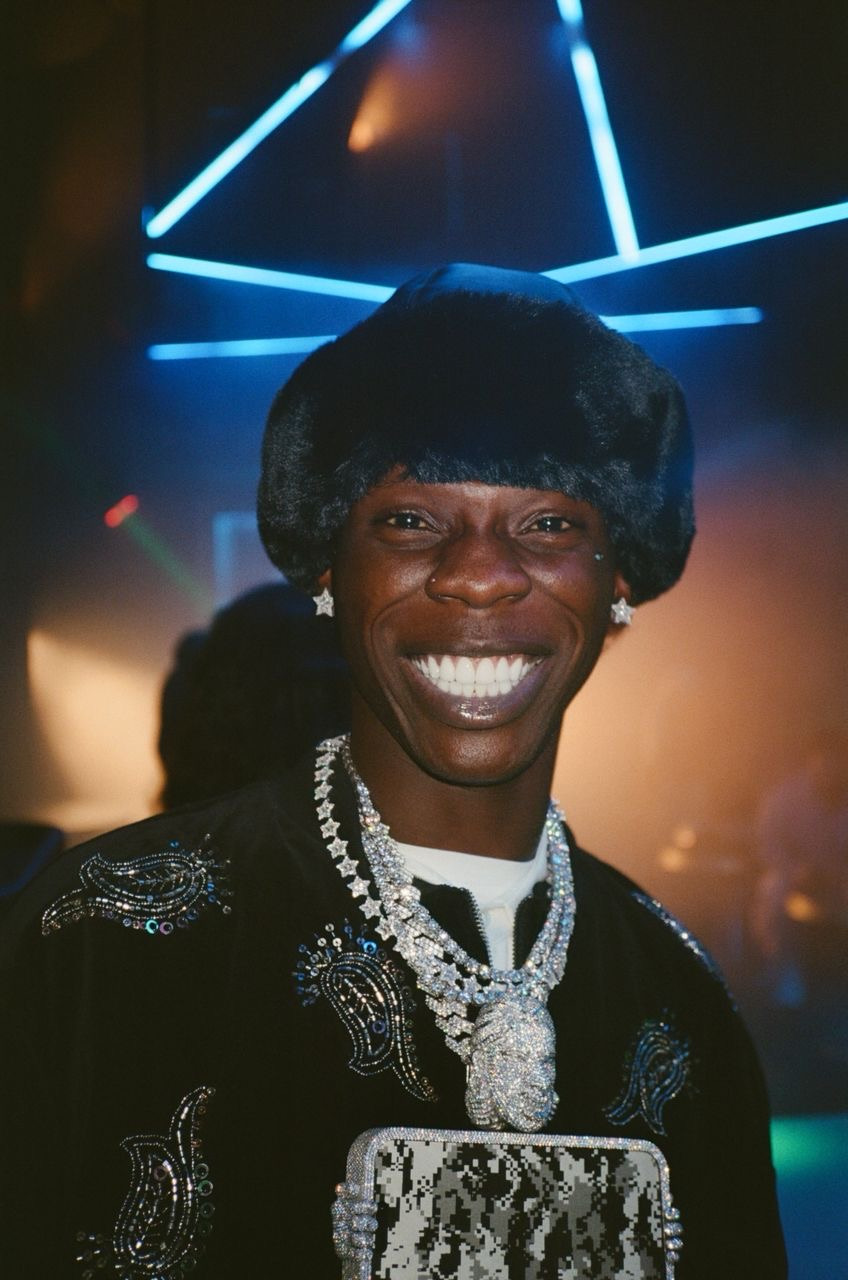
"Gwagwalada" earned Seyi Vibez (pictured) his first number-one on the Official Nigeria Top 100.

Issue Date	Song	Artist(s)	Ref.
5 January	"Asiwaju"	Ruger	
12 January	"Asiwaju"	Ruger	
19 January	"Asiwaju"	Ruger	
26 January	"Asiwaju"	Ruger	
2 February	"Yoga"	Asake	
9 February	"Yoga"	Asake	
16 February	"Sability"	Ayra Starr	
23 February	"Gwagwalada"	BNXN, Kizz Daniel & Seyi Vibez	
2 March	"Gwagwalada"	BNXN, Kizz Daniel & Seyi Vibez	
9 March	"Gwagwalada"	BNXN, Kizz Daniel & Seyi Vibez	
16 March	"Gwagwalada"	BNXN, Kizz Daniel & Seyi Vibez	
23 March	"Party No Dey Stop"	Adekunle Gold & Zinoleesky	
30 March	"Party No Dey Stop"	Adekunle Gold & Zinoleesky	
6 April	"No Competition"	Davido featuring Asake	
13 April	"2:30"	Asake	
20 April	"2:30"	Asake	
27 April	"2:30"	Asake	
4 May	"Charm"	Rema	
11 May	"2:30"	Asake	
18 May	"Charm"	Rema	
25 May	"Charm"	Rema	
1 June	"Amapiano"	Asake & Olamide	
8 June	"Amapiano"	Asake & Olamide	
15 June	"Ojapiano"	KCee	
22 June	"Reason"	Omah Lay	
29 June	"Reason"	Omah Lay	
6 July	"Reason"	Omah Lay	
13 July	"Lonely at the Top"	Asake	
20 July	"Lonely at the Top"	Asake	
27 July	"Lonely at the Top"	Asake	
3 August	"Lonely at the Top"	Asake	
10 August	"Lonely at the Top"	Asake	
17 August	"Lonely at the Top"	Asake	
24 August	"Lonely at the Top"	Asake	
31 August	"Lonely at the Top"	Asake	
7 September	"Lonely at the Top"	Asake	
14 September	"Lonely at the Top"	Asake	
21 September	"Lonely at the Top"	Asake	
28 September	"Ask About Me"	MohBad	
5 October	"Lonely at the Top"	Asake	
12 October	"Lonely at the Top"	Asake	
19 October	"Blood On The Dance Floor"	Odumodublvck, Bloody Civilian & Wale	
26 October	"Blood On The Dance Floor"	Odumodublvck, Bloody Civilian & Wale	
2 November	"Blood On The Dance Floor"	Odumodublvck, Bloody Civilian & Wale	
9 November	"Blood On The Dance Floor"	Odumodublvck, Bloody Civilian & Wale	
16 November	"Holy Ghost"	Omah Lay	
23 November	"Holy Ghost"	Omah Lay	
30 November	"Cast"	Shallipopi featuring Odumodublvck	
7 December	"Cast"	Shallipopi featuring Odumodublvck	
14 December	"Cast"	Shallipopi featuring Odumodublvck	
21 December	"Twe Twe"	Kizz Daniel	
28 December	"Twe Twe"	Kizz Daniel	

== Number-one artists ==
List of number-one artists by total weeks at number one
Position	Artist	Weeks at No. 1
1	Asake	22
2	Odumodublvck	7
3	Kizz Daniel	6
4	Omah Lay	5
5	Ruger	4
5	BNXN	4
5	Seyi Vibez	4
5	Bloody Civilian	4
5	Wale	4
6	Rema	3
6	Shallipopi	3
7	Adekunle Gold	2
7	Zinoleesky	2
7	Olamide	2
8	Ayra Starr	1
8	Davido	1
8	KCee	1
8	MohBad	1

== See also ==
- List of number-one songs of 2024 (Nigeria)
- List of number-one songs of 2025 (Nigeria)
