= Why Love =

2025 single by Asake

Single by Asake

from the album M$ney
- Released: 12 February 2025
- Genre: Amapiano
- Length: 3:30
- Label: Giran Republic
- Songwriter: Ololade Ahmed
- Producer: Magicsticks

Asake singles chronology
"Active" (2024)	"Why Love" (2025)

Music video
- "Why Love" on YouTube

Why Love is a song by Nigerian singer, rapper and songwriter, Asake. It was released on February 12, 2025, under his newly established independent label, Giran Republic. The song serves as the lead single from Asake's album M$ney.

== Composition ==
Why Love is an Amapiano genre with a blend of Afropop vibes.

== Music video ==
The music video was released on same day the song dropped and it first premiered on YouTube and Apple Music, It pictures a romantic scene.

== Charts ==
Chart performance for "Why Love"
Chart (2025)	Peak position
Nigeria Top 100 (TurnTable)	3
UK Afrobeats Singles (OCC)	2
US Afrobeats Songs (Billboard)	5

== Certifications ==
Certifications for "Why Love"
Region	Certification	Certified units/sales
Nigeria (TCSN)	Silver	25,000^{‡}
^{‡} Sales+streaming figures based on certification alone.

== Release history ==
Release history and formats for "Why Love"
Region	Date	Format	Label
Various	12 February 2025	Streaming; digital download	Giran Republic
