= Wave (Asake and Central Cee song) =

2024 single by Asake and Central Cee

Single by Asake and Central Cee

from the album Lungu Boy
- Language: English; Yoruba
- Released: 21 June 2024
- Genre: Afrobeats; Afro fusion; UK drill
- Length: 3:25
- Label: YBNL Nation; Empire Distribution
- Composer: Ahmed Ololade
- Lyricists: Ahmed Ololade; Oakley Neil Caesar-Su
- Producer: Magicsticks

Asake singles chronology
"Only Me" (2024)	"Wave" (2024)	"Active" (2024)

Central Cee singles chronology
"Band4Band" (2024)	"Wave" (2024)	"Did It First" (2024)

Music video
- "Wave" on YouTube

"Wave" is a song by Nigerian singer Asake and the UK drill rapper Central Cee, released on 21 June 2024 through YBNL Nation and Empire Distribution. The song serves as the lead single from Asake's album Lungu Boy and was released ahead of his Lungu Boy World Tour.

== Composition ==
"Wave" was produced by Asake's long-time collaborator Magicsticks.

== Music video ==
The music video for "Wave" was directed by Edgar Esteves in Nigeria. In the video, Asake and Central Cee, accompanied by friends, are seen gallivanting through different locations and streets in Lagos.

== Charts ==
Chart performance for "Wave"
Chart (2024)	Peak position
Ireland (IRMA)	82
Nigeria (TurnTable Top 100)	2
New Zealand Hot Singles (RMNZ)	28
UK Singles (Official Charts)	41
UK Afrobeats (Official Charts)	1
UK Hip Hop/R&B (Official Charts)	6
US Afrobeats Songs (Billboard)	8

== Certifications ==
Certifications for "Wave"
Region	Certification	Certified units/sales
Nigeria (TCSN)	Platinum	100,000^{‡}
^{‡} Sales+streaming figures based on certification alone.

== Release history ==
Release history and formats for "Rush"
Region	Date	Format	Label
Various	21 June 2024	Digital download; streaming	YBNL; Empire
