= Work of Art (album) =

Album by Asake

Studio album by Asake
- Released: 16 June 2023
- Length: 36:00
- Language: Yoruba; English
- Label: YBNL Nation; Empire
- Producer: Magicsticks; Blaisebeatz; P.Priime

Asake chronology
Mr. Money with the Vibe (2022)	Work of Art (2023)	Lungu Boy (2024)

Singles from Work of Art
- 1. "Yoga" Released: 30 January 2023; 2. "2:30" Released: 5 April 2023; 3. "Amapiano" Released: 23 May 2023; 4. "Lonely at the Top" Released: 15 November 2023

Work of Art is the second studio album by Nigerian singer Asake, released on 16 June 2023 through YBNL Nation and Empire Distribution. Preceded by the release of the singles "Yoga", "2:30" and "Amapiano", the album features 14 tracks plugged by Olaitan, with a sole guest appearance from Olamide who was featured on "Amapiano". A remix of "Lonely at the Top" with American singer H.E.R. was released in November 2023.

== Critical reception ==
Professional ratings
Review scores
Source	Rating
African Folder	6/10
Clash	7/10
The Guardian	4/5 stars
Pitchfork	8.0/10
Pulse Nigeria	7.8/10

Alexis Petridis of The Guardian remarked that "perhaps the speed and urgency with which [Asake] makes music accounts for the fact that Work of Art doesn't shift dramatically away from the blueprint laid out on Mr. Money with the Vibe" but also "perhaps Asake is disinclined to fix something that isn't broken, and not merely on account of his last album's success: the constituent elements still amount to a beguilingly lovely sound, summery and appealing". Joshua Minsoo Kim of Pitchfork felt that "Asake understands that his winning formula needs no adjustments" and "some of the most irresistible songs on Work of Art are cheery", like the song "Sunshine". Kim concluded by pointing out that "Asake grew up listening to Nigerian artists who continually evolved the country’s music, like Fela Kuti, Ayinla Omowura, and Wande Coal. His cross-generational, intercontinental music is doing the same."

Adeayo Adebiyi of Pulse Nigeria wrote that the album "rides on momentum and offers sufficient quality for Asake to stabilize his superstar status. And even though it lacks the excitement of his debut album, the mainstream is still largely shaped by his sound so there will be little room for checkmating". Robin Murray of Clash described Work of Art as "the product of someone who cares deeply about every single detail on display" and called it "ridiculously entertaining from start to finish" as it "begins at top speed then hits the accelerator" and is "peppered with fantastic hooks". Murray felt that "if there's one fault here it's that Work of Art never strays far from formula".

== Track listing ==
Work of Art track listing
No.	Title	Writer(s)	Producer(s)	Length
1.	"Olorun"	Ahmed Ololade	Magicsticks	2:36
2.	"Awodi"	Ololade; Olamide Adedeji	Magicsticks	2:16
3.	"2:30"	Ololade; Adedeji	Blaisebeatz; Magicsticks	2:18
4.	"Sunshine"	Ololade; Adedeji; Paul Tucker	Blaisebeatz	3:05
5.	"Mogbe"	Ololade; Adedeji	Magicsticks	2:58
6.	"Basquiat"	Ololade; Adedeji	Magicsticks	2:14
7.	"Amapiano" (with Olamide)	Ololade; Adedeji	Magicsticks	2:45
8.	"What's Up My G"	Ololade; Adedeji	Magicsticks	2:50
9.	"I Believe"	Ololade; Adedeji	Magicsticks	2:25
10.	"Introduction"	Ololade	P.Priime; Magicsticks; Anoop D'Souza	2:18
11.	"Remember"	Ololade; Adedeji	Magicsticks	3:02
12.	"Lonely at the Top"	Ololade; Adedeji	Blaisebeatz; Magicsticks	2:37
13.	"Great Guy"	Ololade	Magicsticks	3:05
14.	"Yoga"	Ololade	Magicsticks	2:16
Total length:				36:00

== Charts ==
Chart performance for Work of Art
Chart (2023)	Peak position
Irish Albums (IRMA)	59
Nigerian Albums (TurnTable)	1
UK Albums (OCC)	20
UK R&B Albums (OCC)	40
US Billboard 200	66
US World Albums (Billboard)	4

== Certifications ==
Certifications for "Work of Art"
Region	Certification	Certified units/sales
United Kingdom (BPI)	Silver	60,000^{‡}
^{‡} Sales+streaming figures based on certification alone.

== Release history ==
Release history and formats for Work of Art
Region	Date	Format	Label
Worldwide	15 June 2023	Streaming; digital download	YBNL; Empire
United Kingdom	15 June 2023	Digital download	YBNL; Empire
United States	15 September 2023	CD	YBNL; Empire
United States	13 October 2023	Vinyl; LP	YBNL; Empire
