= Yoga (Asake song) =

Single by Asake

from the album Work of Art
- Language: English; Nigerian Pidgin; Yoruba
- Released: 30 January 2023
- Genre: Séga
- Length: 2:48
- Label: YBNL Nation; Empire
- Songwriter: Ahmed Ololade
- Producer: Magicsticks

Asake singles chronology
"Blessings (Remix)" (2022)	"Yoga" (2023)	"2:30" (2023)

Music video
- "Yoga" on YouTube

"Yoga" is a song by Nigerian singer Asake. It was released on 30 January 2023, through YBNL Nation and Empire Distribution as the lead single from his second studio album Work of Art (2023). The séga-infused song was produced by Magicsticks.

== Composition ==
"Yoga" marks a departure from the amapiano sound used in Asake's debut album, Mr. Money with the Vibe (2022). The song instead draws on Mauritian séga music and features the ravanne and triangle, two instruments associated with the genre. It keeps elements of Asake's earlier work, like a backing choir and a religious atmosphere, while using a more stripped-down arrangement.

The song uses hand-pounded percussion, bowed strings and a backing choir instead of drum machines, synthesizers and saxophones. Asake also departs from Auto-Tuned melismas, and singing direct refrains instead. The lyrics talk about his desire to protect his peace after a year of success and personal challenges. Asake described the song as being about "minding my business and guarding my peace so no one can disrupt it."

== Music video ==
The music video for "Yoga" was directed by TG Omori and filmed in Dakar, Senegal. The video features colourful imagery and Asake and reality television personality Alexis Skyy exploring the city.

== Commercial performance ==
"Yoga" debuted at number one on the Official Nigeria Top 100 for the week of 27 January to 2 February 2023, with 3.86 million streams and a radio reach of 22.6 million. Released on 30 January at 6:00 p.m. WAT, the song became the first to debut atop the chart with a partial tracking week. It was Asake's seventh number-one entry, extending his record for the most chart-toppers in Nigeria, while producer Magicsticks earned his sixth number one, all through songs with Asake. The song remained at number one for a second week, recording 3.20 million streams and a radio reach of 59.4 million. It joined "Terminator" and "PBUY" as Asake's longest-running solo number-one songs, with two weeks each. By then, Asake had spent 16 weeks at number one across his seven chart-topping singles, behind Omah Lay and Kizz Daniel, who had each spent 18 weeks at the top. In its third week, "Yoga" fell to number three as Ayra Starr's "Sability" reached number one.

== Awards and nominations ==
Year	Awards ceremony	Award description(s)	Results
2023	African Entertainment Awards USA	Best Music Video	Nominated

== Charts ==
=== Weekly charts ===
Chart performance for "Yoga"
Chart (2023)	Peak position
Nigeria (TurnTable Top 100)	1
US Afrobeats Songs (Billboard)	42
UK Afrobeats (Official Charts)	4

=== Year-end charts ===
2023 year-end chart performance for "Yoga"
Chart (2023)	Position
Nigeria (TurnTable Top 100)	28

== Certifications ==
Certifications for "Yoga"
Region	Certification	Certified units/sales
Nigeria (TCSN)	Platinum	100,000^{‡}
^{‡} Sales+streaming figures based on certification alone.
