= T.I Blaze =

Nigerian singer

- Born: Akintunde Abiodun Timileyin; 16 February 2000 (age 26)
- Genres: Afropop; Afrobeat; Street pop
- Occupations: Singer; Songwriter
- Years active: 2021–present
- Label: Dvpper Music

Akintunde Abiodun Timileyin (born 16 February 2000), known professionally as T.I Blaze, is a Nigerian singer, and songwriter currently signed to Dvpper Music. He rose to stardom with the release of his sleeper hit single "Sometimes" in 2021 which became a successful hit in 2022, following the remix with one of Nigerian most influential artists in Africa Olamide, which earned him his first chart entry at number three on Nigeria TurnTable Songs chart, and at number sixteen, on TurnTable End of the Year Top 100 of 2022.

== Career ==
On 25 February 2022, Blaze released The Fresh Prince of Lagos, a 6-track extended play. The project lead track including "Sometimes", with guest appearances from Olamide, Rasaqi NFG, and South African rapper Blxckie. On 11 March 2022, he was named Apple Music’s Up Next Artist for Nigeria. On 5 April 2022, Blaze took to his Instagram story to inform the public about a raid that took place at his house by 1 am by NDLEA in search of drugs. The lyrics of "Sometimes", include the word “Canadian Loud”, which brought the attention of the agency. On 29 April 2022, he released "Kilo" featuring Skiibii. On the week of 9 May 2022, "Kilo" debuted at number 17 on TurnTable Nigeria Official song chart.

On 27 August 2022, Blaze performed "Try", "Sometimes "(remix)", and "Kilo" at Johnnie Walker's Walkers District event at Eagles Club in Surulere. On 8 November 2022, he acquired a new car and house. On 18 November 2022, he released his first studio album El Major, independently through Dvpper Music. The project also features guest appearance from Bella Shmurda, BACKROAD GEE, Fave, Skiibii, Camidoh, and Ladipoe. On 11 February 2023, he performed at the 5th Soundcity MVP Awards Festival. On December 7, 2024 he performed at the Big Steezee event hosted by Ceekaysprout Entertainment held in level three premium event center, Sandton, Johannesburg, South Africa, T.I Blaze performed "Try", "Sometimes "(remix)", "Kilo", Beamer, "trenches luv" and many more at the Big Steezee event. he is a rising star within the Afrobeat scene with several hits to his name.

== Discography ==
=== EPs ===
List of studio extended plays, with selected details and chart positions
Title	Details	Peak chart positions
Title	Details	NG
The Fresh Prince of Lagos	Released: 25 February 2022; Label: Dvpper Music; Formats: Digital download	46
Dangerous Wavy Baby	Released: 3 August 2023; Label: Dvpper Music; Formats: Digital download	16
Shakur	Released: 4 April 2025; Label: Formats: Digital download	

=== Albums ===
List of studio albums, with selected details and chart positions
Title	Details	Peak chart positions
Title	Details	NG
El Major	Released: 18 November 2022; Label: Dvpper Music; Formats: Digital download	11

==== As lead artist ====
List of singles as lead artist, with year released and album shown
Title	Year	Peak chart positions						Certifications	Album
Title	Year	NG	NG Streetpop	SA	UK	UK Afrobeats	US Afrobeats	Certifications	Album
"Tomiwa"	2020	—	—	—	—	—	—		N/A
"Dupe" (feat. Temadey)	2021	—	—	—	—	—	—		N/A
"Sometimes"	2021	—	—	—	—	—	—		The Fresh Prince of Lagos
"Sometimes (remix)" (feat. Olamide)	2022	3	7	—	—	—	—	TCSN: 2× Platinum	The Fresh Prince of Lagos
"Try"	2022	22	10	—	—	—	—		The Fresh Prince Of Lagos
"Kilo" (feat. Skiibii)	2022	17	4	—	—	—	—		El Major
"My Life"	2022	27	7	—	—	—	—		N/A
"Adura" (feat. Oluwacoded)	2022	—	—	—	—	—	—		N/A
"Good Life"	2022	—	—	—	—	—	—		N/A
"Lock Up"	2022	42	14	—	—	—	—		El Major
"Play" (feat. Fave)	2023	—	—	—	—	—	—		El Major
"Wire"	2023	60	9	—	—	—	—		Dangerous Wavy Baby
