= Top Boy (album) =

Studio album by Spinall
- Released: 17 February 2023
- Recorded: 2021–2023
- Genres: Afrobeats; amapiano
- Length: 45:27
- Label: TheCAPMusic
- Producers: Spinall; DJ Snake; Magicsticks; Kel-P; Unknown Nick; TMXO; The Eggman; D3an; Caltonic SA; TSB; Ozedikus; Smeez

Spinall chronology
Grace (2020)	Top Boy (2023)	Èkó Groove (2025)

Singles from Top Boy
- 1. "Sere (Remix)" Released: 7 May 2021; 2. "Cloud 9" Released: 3 December 2021; 3. "Palazzo" Released: 13 May 2022; 4. "Power (Remember Who You Are)" Released: 9 September 2022; 5. "Top Mama" Released: 12 October 2022; 6. "Power (Remember Who You Are) (Nasty C Remix)" Released: 11 November 2022; 7. "Bunda" Released: 20 January 2023

Top Boy is the sixth studio album by Nigerian disc jockey and record producer Spinall. It was released on 17 February 2023 through TheCAPMusic. The album features guest appearances from Stefflon Don, Fireboy DML, Tamera, Phyno, Summer Walker, Amaka, 6lack, Azanti, Olamide, Kemuel, Niniola, Asake, TSB, Äyanna, Amaarae, Blxckie, Reekado Banks, DJ Snake, Zaiam, Minz, Bnxn, Ladipoe, Tay Iwar, Ntosh Gazi and Adekunle Gold. Production was primarily handled by Spinall, along with additional production from Magicsticks, Caltonic SA, D3an, TSB, DJ Snake, The Eggman, Kel-P, NKVY, Ozedikus, Smeez and Unknown Nick.

== Background ==
In an interview with Apple Music's Dadaboy Ehiz, Spinall explained that the album's title, Top Boy, was inspired by people who "have beaten the odds" and used the resources available to them to succeed. He stated that the title also reflected the independent and resourceful nature of many of the artists featured on the project. Spinall described the album, which took three years to complete, as a departure from his previous releases because he was heavily involved in its production and songwriting.

== Singles ==
The lead single from Top Boy, is the remix of another track off his previous album, Grace, which was titled "Sere". It featured Fireboy DML and was remixed with 6LACK on 7 May 2021. The song was produced by Kel-P and was co-produced by Spinall.

The second single, "Cloud 9" features Adekunle Gold and was released on 3 December 2021. The song was co-written and produced by Spinall and the music video for the track was released on 21 January 2022 and shot and directed in Lagos, Nigeria by Dammy Twitch.

The third single, "Palazzo", features Asake and was produced by Magicsticks, co-written by Olamide and engineered by Eskeez. The song was released on 13 May 2022 and the music video was shot and directed by TG Omori.

The fourth single, "Power (Remember Who You Are) is a collaborative single with Spinall, Summer Walker, DJ Snake and Äyanna. It was released on 9 September 2022 along with its music video and was produced by The Eggman, Spinall, DJ Snake and Unknown Nick. The record was mixed by Dr. Dre, Dos Dias and Quentin Gilkey, engineered by JB Made It, and mastered by Brian Gardner.

The fifth single, "Top Mama" is a mid-tempo Amapiano song featuring Reekado Banks, Phyno and Ntosh Gazi. The song was released on 12 October 2022 and produced by Spinall, Caltonic SA and NKVY. The video was directed by The Alien.

The sixth single is the remix to "Power (Remember Who You Are)". It was released on 11 November 2022 and was remixed with South African rapper Nasty C.

The seventh single, "Bunda" features Kemuel and Olamide. It was produced by Ozedikus and released on 20 January 2023. The music video for "Bunda" was directed by TG Omori.

== Critical reception ==
Top Boy received generally positive reviews from music critics. Adeayo Adebiyi of Pulse Nigeria described it as "an album that offers something to every listener while also highlighting the abilities and ambitions of its curator", praising its blend of amapiano] elements and Afrobeats themes. He awarded it an 8.0 out of 10. Yinoluwa Olowofoyeku of Afrocritik characterized Top Boy as "an exhibition of what is possible when albums are music-driven, talent-focused, network-bolstered, and intentionally crafted," awarding it a 7 out of 10. Emmanuel Esomnofu, writing for The Native, called it "arguably the best album Spinall has created" and added that it "finally solidifies his artistry."

== Track listing ==
Top Boy track listing
No.	Title	Writer(s)	Producer(s)	Length
1.	"Cruise" (featuring Azanti and Zaiam)	Nathan Otekalu-Aje; Hamza Liman	Spinall	2:32
2.	"Everyday" (featuring Minz)	Oluseye Sodamola; Damilola Aminu	Spinall	2:29
3.	"Give Me Love" (featuring Niniola)	Niniola Apata	Smeez; D3an	3:46
4.	"Cloud 9" (featuring Adekunle Gold)	Sodamola; Adekunle Kosoko	Spinall	3:08
5.	"Oshey" (featuring Bnxn and Stefflon Don)	Sodamola; Daniel Benson; Stephanie Allen	TMXO	2:29
6.	"Top Mama" (featuring Reekado Banks, Phyno and Ntosh Gazi)	Ayoleyi Solomon; Chibuzor Azubuike; Ntokozo Soko	Spinall; Caltonic SA	3:28
7.	"Honest" (featuring Tay Iwar, Tamera and TSB)	Austin Iwar; Tamera Foster; Ikeoluwa Oladigbolu	Spinall; TSB	3:02
8.	"Palazzo" (featuring Asake)	Sodamola; Ahmed Ololade; Olamide Adedeji	Magicsticks	3:06
9.	"Bow Down" (featuring Amaarae)	Sodamola; Ama Genfi	Spinall	2:03
10.	"Outside" (featuring Blxckie and Ladipoe)	Sihle Sithole; Ladipo Eso	Spinall	1:52
11.	"Just to Be" (featuring Amaka)	Jessica Nwokike	Spinall	3:24
12.	"Bunda" (featuring Kemuel and Olamide)	Sodamola; Kemuel Emmanuel; Adedeji	Ozedikus	3:34
13.	"Sere (Remix)" (featuring Fireboy DML and 6lack)	Sodamola; Adedamola Adefolahan; Ricardo Valentine	Spinall; Kel-P	3:14
14.	"Power (Remember Who You Are)" (with Summer Walker, DJ Snake and Äyanna)	Sodamola; Summer Walker; Ayanna Christie Brown; William Grigahcine; Nicholas Audino; Eunice Waymon; Andrew Macdonald; Lewis Hughes	Spinall; DJ Snake; Unknown Nick; The Eggman	3:34
15.	"Power (Remember Who You Are)" (Nasty C Remix; with Summer Walker, DJ Snake, Äyanna and Nasty C)	Sodamola; Walker; Brown; Grigahcine; Audino; Waymon; Macdonald; Hughes; Nsikayesizwe Ngocobo	Spinall	3:41
Total length:				45:27

== Personnel ==
- Sodamola "Spinall" Desmond – main artist, producer, mixing engineer, mastering engineer, writer
- Ama "Amaarae" Genfi – featured artist, writer
- Daniel "Bnxn" Benson – featured artist, writer
- Ladipo "Ladipoe" Eso – featured artist, writer
- Ahmed "Asake" Ololade – featured artist, writer
- Olamide Adedeji - featured artist, writer
- Damilola "Minz" Aminu – featured artist, writer
- Jessica "Amaka" Nwokike – featured artist, writer
- Summer Walker - featured artist, writer
- Austin "Tay" Iwar – featured artist, writer
- Tamera Foster – featured artist, writer
- Kemuel Emmanuel – featured artist, writer
- Ricardo "6lack" Valentine – featured artist, writer
- Sihle "Blxckie" Sithole – featured artist, writer
- Adedamola "Fireboy DML" Adefolahan - featured artist, writer
- Nsikayesizwe "Nasty C" Ngocobo - featured artist, writer
- Ayanna Christie Brown - featured artist, writer
- Stephanie "Stefflon Don" Allen - featured artist, writer
- Niniola Apata - featured artist, writer
- Chibuzor "Phyno" Azubuike - featured artist, writer
- Nathan "Azanti" Otekalu-Aje - featured artist, writer
- Ntokozo "Ntosh Gazi" Soko - featured artist, writer
- Ayoleyi "Reekado Banks" Solomon - featured artist, writer
- Hamza "Zaiam" Liman - featured artist, writer
- Ikeoluwa "TSB" Oladigbolu - featured artist, writer, producer
- William "DJ Snake" Grigahcine - featured artist, writer, producer
- Nicholas "Unknown Nick" Audino - writer, producer
- Eunice "Nina Simone" Waymon - writer
- Andrew Macdonald - writer
- Lewis Hughes - writer
- Kareem "Magicsticks" Temitayo - producer
- Elias "Caltonic SA" Shitlhangu - producer
- D3an - producer
- The Eggman - producer
- Kelvin "Kel-P" Peter Amba - producer
- NKVY - producer
- Iginoba "Ozedikus" Osaze - producer
- Smeez - producer
- Quentin "Q" Gilkey - mixing engineer
- David "Dos Dias" Bishop - mixing engineer, recording engineer
- Andre "Dr. Dre" Young - mixing engineer
- Brian Gardner - mastering engineer
- Adenola "Eskeez" Gabriel - mixing engineer, mastering engineer
- Jonathan "JB Made It" Mensan - recording engineer
- The Alien - video director
- TG Omori – video director
