= New Religion (Olamide song) =

Single by Olamide featuring Asake

from the album Unruly
- Released: 2 June 2023
- Genre: Amapiano; hip-hop; fuji
- Length: 2:33
- Label: YBNL Nation; Empire
- Songwriters: Olamide Adedeji; Ahmed Ololade
- Producers: Magicsticks; B.Banks

Olamide singles chronology
"Amapiano" (2023)	"New Religion" (2023)	"Arizona" (2023)

Asake singles chronology
"Amapiano" (2023)	"New Religion" (2023)	"Lonely at the Top" (2023)

Music video
- "New Religion" on YouTube

"New Religion" is a song by Nigerian rapper Olamide. The song is a blend of amapiano, hip-hop, and fuji. Featuring vocals from label signee Asake, the song was released on 2 June 2023 through YBNL Nation and Empire Distribution as the lead single from the former's tenth studio album Unruly (2023).

== Background ==
The release of "New Religion" coincided with the announcement of the release of Olamide's tenth studio album Unruly (2023), although the initial release date was later was not met.

== Reception ==
"New Religion" received positive reviews from music critics. Damilare of Digimillenials highlighted the song's vibrant energy and genre fusion, stating: "On 'New Religion', Olamide enlists his signee Asake, on a track that blends amapiano and afropop. With its log drums and danceable beat, New Religion encourages listeners to bask in revelry, let loose, and enjoy the moment. It is a song laced with an energy that is bound to get any crowd moving."

Adeayo Adebiyi of Pulse Nigeria noted that the song, alongside tracks like other Unruly tracks like "Gaza", "Hardcore", and "Street Jam", highlights Olamide's strength in delivering commanding rap verses without relying on "sonic shapeshifting", thereby creating the familiarity listeners need to connect with his artistry.

Patrick Ezema of Afrocritik described "New Religion" as a central track on Unruly, highlighting the chemistry between Olamide and Asake. He remarked, "No one shares a significant chemistry with Olamide than Asake", as the duo "usher in 'New Religion' under their joint reign." Ezema praised producer Magicsticks for blending log drums, saxophone, and violin to create a dynamic backdrop, noting that "these sonic elements could easily be fixtures in Asake's musicality." He added that the track exemplifies Olamide's full embrace of Amapiano and sparks discussions on how his creative relationship with Asake influences both artists.

Emmanuel Esomnofu's review for the Native highlighted the synergy between Olamide and Asake on "New Religion", describing them as "sonic twins, tapping from similar strains within the Yoruba consciousness." He noted that while Asake's style draws from the "combative sphere of Fuji", Olamide leans towards hip-hop, and the track "merges both sensibilities." Esomnofu called the song "a fine record" and pointed out that beyond its individual brilliance, it reflects the broader artistic direction Olamide explores on Unruly.

== Music video ==
The music video for "New Religion", directed by Jyde Ajala, was shot in a natural environment and includes a chessboard scene where Olamide and Asake recreate a viral photo of football legends Cristiano Ronaldo and Lionel Messi. The video features the two artists alternating their verses and incorporates various artistic elements.

== Commercial performance ==
"New Religion" debuted at No. 2 on the Official Nigeria Top 100, becoming Olamide's 11th top ten entry and Asake's 17th. The song garnered 3.90 million on-demand streams, ranking second in streaming, and achieved 45.9 million in radio reach, placing tenth on the radio chart. It also marked the highest-charting hip-hop/rap song in Nigeria since Black Sherif's "Kwaku the Traveller" held the No. 1 spot in May 2022. With "Amapiano" and "New Religion" occupying the first and second positions on the chart, Olamide and Asake became the first unofficial duo to dominate the top two spots in a single week.

== Charts ==
Chart performance for "New Religion"
Chart (2023)	Peak position
Nigeria Top 100 (TurnTable)	2
US Afrobeats Songs (Billboard)	17
UK Afrobeats (Official Charts)	8

== Personnel ==
Credits adapted from Apple Music.

- Olamide Adedeji – vocals, songwriter
- Ahmed Ololade - vocals, songwriter
- Magicsticks - production
- B.Banks - production
- Jaycen Joshua - engineer

== Release history ==
Release history and formats for "New Religion"
Region	Date	Format	Label
Various	2 June 2023	Streaming; digital download	YBNL Nation; Empire
