= 1ucid =

Ghanaian musician

- Born: Kwadwo Bedihene; Accra, Ghana
- Genres: Hip hop, Afrobeats
- Occupations: Singer, songwriter ,Businessperson
- Instrument: Vocals

Kwadwo Bedihene, known professionally as 1ucid (stylized as 1UCID), is a Ghanaian singer-songwriter, and businessperson , creative and record producer based in the United States. He is known for his single Miss You which peaked on US, Netherlands, Ghana, Nigeria, and France iTunes Charts.

== Early life and education ==
Kwadwo was born in Accra, Ghana but relocated to the United States of America at the age of 9. He received a Bachelor of Science degree from the University of Akron.

== Career ==
Kwadwo started as a creative in 2021 when he released a documentary which was inspired by Ghanaian theologian, Mensa Otabil's sermon "A Generational Thinker".

In 2022, Kwadwo released two singles "Miss You" and "It's Giving" Same year, he covered Pulse Nigeria Future Sounds playlist. In January 2023, Kwadwo was cited as one of the artists to look out for by P.M News. Same year, he was announced by Audiomack as one of the top trending artistes alongside Snazzy the Optimist, Asake and Kizz Daniel and was one of the most streamed artists first week of February 2023.
