= M$ney =

Studio album by Asake
- Released: 1 May 2026
- Recorded: 2025–2026
- Length: 35:07
- Languages: Yoruba; English; Nigerian Pidgin
- Labels: Giran Republic; Empire
- Producers: Magicsticks; P.Priime; Nana Pokes; DJ Snake; Kabza De Small; Blaisebeatz; YungAce; AoD; Gaetan Judd; Awele Kelechukwu; Alhaji Tunga

Asake chronology
Real, Vol. 1 (2026)	M$ney (2026)

Singles from M$ney
- 1. "Why Love" Released: 11 February 2025; 2. "Badman Gangsta" Released: 25 July 2025; 3. "Worship" Released: 19 March 2026

M$ney (pronounced "money", stylized in all caps) is the fourth studio album by Nigerian singer Asake. It was released on 1 May 2026 through Giran Republic and Empire. The album includes contributions from DJ Snake, Tiakola, and Kabza De Small.

It served as the first album released under his own imprint, Giran Republic, in partnership with Empire, following his departure from YBNL Nation. The album was supported by the singles "Why Love", "Badman Gangsta", and "Worship".

The album achieved the largest first-week sales debut in Nigeria, with 57 million streams and 38,020 sales, surpassing Wizkid's Morayo.

== Release and promotion ==
The album was announced under the title Money on 5 June 2025 through Asake’s X account. On 22 April 2026, Asake revealed the revised stylization, M$ney, alongside the album’s marble-themed visual concept and a gradually unveiled cover artwork across digital platforms. The album was released the following week.

== Commercial performance ==
Six days following its release, M$ney had reached 37.5 million streams on Nigeria Spotify, already breaking the record for the most streams for an album within a week, previously set by Wizkid's Morayo, which held the record since November 2024 with 35.8 million streams. M$ney ended the week with 42.2 million streams.

== Critical reception ==
Professional ratings
Review scores
Source	Rating
African Folder	7.2/10
The Native	6.7/10
Pitchfork	5.6/10
Pulse Nigeria	7.0/10
Shatter the Standards	4/5 stars

M$ney received a mixed-to-positive reception, with critics broadly praising its rich production while noting a decline in lyrical ambition compared to Asake's earlier work. On M$ney, Asake frames wealth through spirituality and gratitude, weaving Islamic devotions, Yoruba proverbs and divine supplications across a sonic palette drawing from Fújì, Amapiano, gospel and jazz. Chibuzo Emmanuel of The Native observed that M$ney is simultaneously Asake's most sonically polished project and one of his least lyrically substantial, with Magicsticks' production frequently elevating the writing into a sensorially dense experience. Priya Okafor of Shatter the Standards characterised the record as àdúrà pop noting that the better music stays closest to home in Asake's collaborations with Magicsticks. Adeayo Adebiyi of Pulse Nigeria described it as Asake's performance of wealth, marked by sublime melodies and fantastically produced records, even if he spends a bulk of the album proving he doesn't have to try.

== Track listing ==
M$ney track listing
No.	Title	Writer(s)	Producer(s)	Length
1.	"Intro"	Ahmed Ololade; Nana Ntorinkansah; Nkululeko Vilakazi	Nana Pokes; Joshua Olusola; Magicsticks; Irvin Johnson	0:26
2.	"Worship" (featuring DJ Snake)	Ololade; William Gringahcine; Kareem Temitayo	DJ Snake; Magicsticks; Olusola; Johnson	2:43
3.	"Gratitude"	Ololade; Olasunkanmi; Ntorinkansah; Ben Burelle	Magicsticks; Olusola; Johnson	2:49
4.	"Rora"	Ololade; Olasunkanmi; Ntorinkansah	Magicsticks; Olusola; Irvin Johnson	2:32
5.	"Amen"	Ololade; Olasunkanmi; Ntorikansah	Magicsticks; Olusola; Johnson	3:25
6.	"Wa"	Ololade; Marcel Akunwata; Temitope Salami; Ntorinkansah	Blaisebeatz; Yungace; Olusola; Magicsticks; Johnson	2:23
7.	"MCBH"	Ololade; Akunwata; Salami; Ntorinkansah	Blaisebeatz; Awele Kelechukwu; Alhaji Tunga; Fabrice Lemuel; Olusola; Magicsticks; Johnson	2:50
8.	"Why Love"	Ololade; Olasunkanmi	Magicsticks; Johnson	3:30
9.	"Forgiveness"	Ololade; Ntorinkansah; Olasunkanmi; Burelle	Magicsticks; Nana Pokes; Olusola; Johnson	2:38
10.	"Oba"	Ololade; Olasunkanmi; Alfons Kettner; Bobby Caldwell	Magicsticks; Olusola; Johnson	2:47
11.	"Badman Gangsta" (featuring Tiakola)	Ololade; Rich Harrison; Stanley Walden; Amerie Mi Marie Rogers; Alzstair O'Donnell; Peace Oredope	AoD; P.Priime; Gaestan Judd; Dro; Johnson	2:23
12.	"Asambe" (featuring Kabza de Small)	Ololade; Kabelo Petrus Motha; Ntorinkansah	Motha; Lamuel; Olusola; Magicsticks; Johnson	3:32
13.	"Skilful"	Ololade; Olasunkanmi; Ntorinkansah	Magicsticks; Olusola; Johnson	3:03
Total length:				35:07

== Charts ==
Chart performance for M$ney
Chart (2026)	Peak position
Canadian Albums (Billboard)	69
Irish Albums (IRMA)	58
Irish Independent Albums (IRMA)	4
Nigerian Albums (TurnTable)	1
Portuguese Albums (AFP)	160
UK Albums (Official Charts)	27
US Independent Albums (Billboard)	30
US World Albums (Billboard)	2
