= Danny S =

Nigerian musical artist

Danny S Ojo Daniel Olaborode

Background information
- Born: Ojo Daniel Olaborode; 11 November 1995 (age 31)
- Origin: Ekiti State, Nigeria
- Genres: Afrobeats; Afropop; Fuji
- Occupation: Singer - Songwriter - Producer -Performer
- Instruments: Vocals, Singing
- Years active: 2013–present
- Label: Chaolin Tempu

Ojo Daniel Olaborode (born November 11), known professionally as Danny S, is a Nigerian street-hop singer, songwriter and performer. He is known for blending Afrobeats, street-hop, and Fuji music in his recordings. He gained recognition with the release of the single "Ege" in 2018, plugged by Olaitan Salaudeen, followed by songs including "Japaa" and "Waka Jeje", the latter featuring Olamide. His 2025 debut studio album, Olaborode, further showcased his fusion of street-hop and Fuji-inspired sounds.

== Early life and education ==
Danny S was born on 11 November 1995 in Ilorin, Kwara state. He attended Saint Francis Secondary School, Akure, Ondo State before studying Mass Communication at the Lagos State Polytechnic Annex Campus.

== Music career ==
Danny S developed an interest in music at an early age, participating in music at the tender age before recording his first song, "Shengbenne," in 2013. Although he continued to play football recreationally, his father encouraged him to abandon football and pursue music, citing his own preference for music.

He began attracting public attention in 2018 with the release of "Ege," a street-hop single that increased his visibility within the Nigerian music scene. The accompanying music video was directed by Unlimited L.A. Later in 2018, he released "Oh My God," further building his audience through his blend of street-hop, Afrobeats, and Fuji-inspired sounds.

In 2019, Danny S collaborated with Olamide on "Waka Jeje," and in 2025, he released his debut studio album, Olaborode, a 16-track project that fuses Afrobeats, Fuji, and street-hop. The album features a collaboration with 9ice on the track "Owo Lotto".

== Discography ==
=== Albums ===
- Merci (2026)
- Olaborode (2025)

=== Extended plays (EPs) ===
- "No Calamity" (2026)
- "Olamide" (2024)
- "La Grace" (2024)
- "No Regret" (2021)

=== Singles ===
- “Shengbenne” (2013)
- "Off the Lite" (2017)
- "Ege (Dribble)" (2018)
- "Japaa" (2018)
- "Waka Jeje featuring Olamide" (2019)
- "God Abeg" (2023)
- "Halley" (2023)
- "Omo Lile" (2024)
- "Omo Lile (remix) feature Balloranking & Kashcoming” (2025)
- "Omo Lile (remix) featuring Qdot" (2025)
- "OGO" (2025)
- “Ta Ta Ta” (2026)
- "Ope" (2026)
- “OGO (remix) featuring Portable" (2026)
- "Igberaga" (2026)
