= Mr. Money with the Vibe =

Studio album by Asake
- Released: 7 September 2022
- Genre: Afropop; progressive pop
- Length: 30:14
- Language: Yoruba; English
- Label: YBNL; Empire
- Producer: Magicsticks

Asake chronology
Ololade Asake (2022)	Mr. Money with the Vibe (2022)	Work of Art (2023)

Singles from Mr. Money with the Vibe
- 1. "Sungba (Remix)" Released: 27 March 2022; 2. "Peace Be Unto You" Released: 17 June 2022; 3. "Terminator" Released: 16 August 2022

Mr. Money with the Vibe is the debut studio album by Nigerian singer Asake, following his signing with YBNL Nation in February 2022. It was released on 7 September 2022, through YBNL Nation and Empire Distribution. The album comprises 12 tracks, which were entirely produced by Magicsticks, and plugged by Olaitan. The album features two guest appearances from Russ and Burna Boy. It was supported by the singles, "Peace Be Unto You (PBUY)" and "Terminator", released in June 2022 and August 2022 respectively. Mr. Money with the Vibe serves as a follow-up to his extended play Ololade Asake which was released in February 2022, immediately after being signed by Olamide to YBNL. Following the album's release, it peaked at number 66 on the Billboard 200 chart in September 2022.

== Background ==
Prior to the release of Mr. Money with the Vibe, Asake had been releasing singles like "Body", "Yan Yan", "Don't Hype Me", "Lady", and "Mr Money". He gained wider recognition after Olamide, whom Asake credits as playing a key role in his career and the founder of YBNL Nation, heard an unreleased version of "Omo Ope" and recorded a guest verse on the song. Soon after, Asake got signed under YBNL, which operates a distribution partnership with Empire. "Omo Ope" was officially released on 19 January 2022, and was followed by an extended play titled Ololade Asake on 17 February 2022, comprising the tracks "Baba God", "Trabaye", "Sungba" and the aforementioned "Omo Ope". All songs and videos were plugged by Olaitan. Asake had released additional material in 2022, such as "Palazzo" with DJ Spinall, and "Bandana" with Fireboy DML, from the album Playboy (2022).

== Critical reception ==
Professional ratings
Review scores
Source	Rating
Afrocritik	7/10
The Native	8.2/10
Pulse Nigeria	8.8/10

Motolani Alake of Pulse Nigeria described Mr. Money with the Vibe as a pop album that "excels on perfect musicality, afforded by its production." He further went on to state that it was "Nigeria's best album this year so far" with "potential to become a classic," awarding it a rating of 8.8/10. Music in Africa writer Gabriel Myers Hansen commended Asake for his "easy vocal tone that still manages to retain enough passion to explore the whole gamut of human emotion," and Magicsticks for his "soulful piano and violin contributions." He concluded that the album proved that "Asake couldn't hand in a poor song if he tried." Uzoma Ihejirika for The Native rated the album an 8.2 out of 10, adding that the album would be proclaimed as "a soundtrack for an era when a newcomer seized an opportunity and never let go."

Rolling Stone Australia ranked the album #142 on their list of the "250 Greatest Albums of the 21st Century So Far," with editor Christian Hoard calling it "long on pleasure and presence" and "a debut you shouldn't miss." Emmanuel Daraloye, writing for Afrocritik awarded the album a 7/10 rating, stating that throughout the album Asake "effortlessly secures the end-of-the-year shows and concerts." He further stated that he had "perhaps, secured his legacy as one of the outstanding hitmakers in the Nigerian music industry." In a review for The Lagos Review, Caleb Olorunmaiye wrote that Mr. Money with the Vibe embodied Lagos life as "fast paced, boisterous, energetic" with a sound that "enraptures and serenades you," concluding that the album "delivers on the promise of bringing a vibe" and that "Asake is everything he thinks he is." Michael Aromolaran of the Culture Custodian said that Asake ruled "both worlds...Banana Island and Badagry" through a sound that bridged street and elite spaces, and concluded that "Asake mostly triumphs" and rightly called himself a "chameleon."

== Chart performance ==
The album was highly anticipated following Asake's run of releases after signing to YBNL Nation. The interest translated into strong streaming results in Nigeria and other markets. Mr. Money with the Vibe broke the record on Apple Music for the biggest opening for an African album in three days. It also became the first African album to place all its tracks within the top ten of the Apple Music Nigeria Top 100, a run that lasted from its release on 8 September until 15 September 2022, when Wizkid's "Bad to Me" released. Within 48 hours, the album's third track "Organise" returned to the top position, alongside eight other songs from the project in the top ten. The album also posted the largest debut week for any album on Audiomack since TurnTable Charts began tracking in July 2020.

Upon its release, the album topped the Apple Music Top Albums chart in 31 countries, including Nigeria, the United Kingdom, and Ireland. Tracks from Mr. Money with the Vibe entered the Apple Music Daily Top 100 in 60 countries, with 26 of those countries seeing songs from the album reach the top ten. Several tracks also reached number one in 14 countries worldwide. Mr. Money with the Vibe debuted at number 22 on the UK Albums Chart, making it the first Nigerian album to debut on the chart. The album also peaked at number one in 26 countries on the Apple Music Albums Chart, including 6 European countries.

== Track listing ==
All tracks are written by Ahmed Ololade and produced by Kareem "Magicsticks" Temitayo, except where noted.

Mr. Money with the Vibe track listing
No.	Title	Writer(s)	Length
1.	"Dull"		1:40
2.	"Terminator"		2:36
3.	"Organise"		2:04
4.	"Peace Be Unto You (PBUY)"		2:33
5.	"Dupe"		2:43
6.	"Muse"		1:57
7.	"Joha"		2:28
8.	"Nzaza"		3:04
9.	"Ototo"		2:37
10.	"Reason" (featuring Russ)	Ololade; Russell James Vitale	2:12
11.	"Sunmomi"		2:49
12.	"Sungba (Remix)" (featuring Burna Boy)	Ololade; Damini Ogulu	3:30
Total length:			30:14

== Charts ==
Chart performance for Mr. Money with the Vibe
Chart (2022)	Peak position
Irish Albums (OCC)	27
Nigerian Albums (TurnTable)	1
Nigerian Street-Pop Albums (TurnTable)	1
UK Albums (OCC)	22
US Billboard 200	66

== Certifications ==
Certifications for "Mr. Money with the Vibe"
Region	Certification	Certified units/sales
Nigeria (TCSN)	4× Platinum	200,000^{‡}
United Kingdom (BPI)	Gold	100,000^{‡}
^{‡} Sales+streaming figures based on certification alone.
