= Worship (Asake song) =

2026 single by Asake featuring DJ Snake

Single by Asake featuring DJ Snake

from the album M$ney
- Released: 19 March 2026
- Recorded: 2025
- Genre: Afrobeats; fújì; street pop; EDM
- Length: 2:49
- Label: Giran Republic; Empire
- Songwriters: Ahmed Ololade; William Grigahcine
- Producers: Magicsticks; DJ Snake

Asake singles chronology
"Turbulence" (2026)	"Worship" (2026)	"Chanel" (2026)

DJ Snake singles chronology
"In the Dark" (2025)	"Worship" (2026)

Music video
- "Worship" on YouTube

"Worship" is a song by Nigerian singer and songwriter Asake, featuring French-Algerian record producer DJ Snake. It was released on 19 March 2026, through Giran Republic and EMPIRE, accompanied by an official music video. A cross-cultural fusion of Afrobeats, fújì, and electronic dance influences, "Worship" was produced by DJ Snake in partnership with Nigerian producer Magicsticks. The song centres on spiritual gratitude, resilience, and faith, with Asake delivering lyrics primarily referencing the Arabic phrase al-ḥamdu li-llāh ("praise be to God").

The track was first performed live during Asake's Red Bull Symphonic event in Brooklyn, New York, in late 2025 in the United States. The studio recording was released the following March to coincide with Eid al-Fitr celebrations. Its accompanying music video, shot against a beach backdrop, presents a stripped-back, contemplative visual aesthetic distinct from Asake's characteristically high-energy live performances. Commercially, "Worship" debuted at number five on the Billboard U.S. Afrobeats Songs chart.

== Background and release ==
In February 2025, Asake established his own record label, Giran Republic, following his departure from YBNL Nation. On 8 November 2025, Asake headlined the Red Bull Symphonic series at Kings Theatre in Brooklyn, New York, becoming the first African artist to lead the orchestral showcase in the United States. The performance paired Asake with conductor Glenn Alexander II and a 33-piece orchestra, and featured surprise appearances from Wizkid, Gunna, Central Cee, Tiakola, and Fridayy. During the set, Asake debuted "Worship" live for the first time, performing it within the orchestral arrangement. DJ Snake was also present at the event as a performer, and it was during this shared appearance that the two artists finalised their creative collaboration on the studio version of the track.

In the weeks leading up to the single's release, videos circulated widely on social media showing Asake performing Umrah in Mecca, Saudi Arabia, and attempting to touch the Kaaba amid crowds of pilgrims. The footage generated significant attention online and was widely read alongside the subsequent release of "Worship" as an alignment between personal religious observance and artistic output. "Worship" was released as an unannounced surprise drop on March 19, 2026, through Giran Republic and Empire. Asake posted on social media on the eve of Eid al-Fitr, stating "Eid Mubarak 🌙 Stay in Worship 🤲🏽", which simultaneously served as both the announcement and release. The release coincided with the end of Ramadan and the start of Eid celebrations. The release followed Asake's return from Umrah in Saudi Arabia. The single followed Asake's joint EP ReaL, Vol. 1 with Wizkid, released in January 2026. The album was released on May 1, 2026, and includes collaborations with Tiakola, DJ Snake, and Kabza de Small.

== Composition and lyrics ==
"Worship" is a mid-tempo record produced by DJ Snake in collaboration with Magicsticks.

== Music video ==
An official music video was released simultaneously with the single on March 19, 2026, directed by Edgar Esteves. The video shows Asake dressed entirely in white and filmed against a serene beach backdrop, alongside choirs similarly dressed in white, framing the performance as a moment of personal and spiritual communion. Visual choices in the video, including imagery of open water, white garments, and a stripped-back setting, correspond to the song's thematic concerns with spiritual devotion, transcendence, and peace.

== Critical reception ==
Writing for Deeds Magazine, Chibuzo Emmanuel described "Worship" as the opening release of Asake’s M$NEY era, noting that the song reflected his rise within African music following a period of sustained commercial success. The review also highlighted the track’s production, particularly its use of piano keys and horn arrangements, which Emmanuel compared to the atmosphere of a church worship session. On 1 May 2026, Rolling Stone included "Worship" on its weekly “Songs You Need to Know” list. Craft Party of Trendy Beatz gave an insightful review to the song, noting "Worship" for its themes of faith, gratitude, and perseverance. Party also stated that Asake delivered the song in a melodic style, while the repeated chorus emphasized its central message. The review also commented on DJ Snake’s production for combining Afrobeats with an international sound while maintaining the song’s core identity. Jerry Dagogo of Naij hub considered the song to be as motivational in tone and noted its appeal to listeners familiar with Asake’s musical style.

== Credits and personnel ==
- Ahmed "Asake" Ololade – vocals, songwriting
- William "DJ Snake" Grigahcine – production
- Kareem "Magicsticks" Temitayo – production
- Leandro "Dro" Hidalgo – mastering
- Nana "Pokes" Ntorinkansah – bass guitar
- Jai Patel – trombone
- Benjamin Burrell – orchestra
- Joshua Olusola – recording engineering, mixing, mastering
- Irvin Johnson – mixing
- David Melodee – keyboardist
- Chineke! Orchestra – orchestra
- Timothy Olayinka – saxophonist
- O’Neil Akuoko – saxophonist
- Soweto Gospel Choir – choir
- Okwi Iguwe – trumpet
- Pelle Alfredsson – guitar

== Charts ==
Chart performance for "Worship"
Chart (2026)	Peak position
Nigeria (TurnTable Top 100)	1
UK Afrobeats (Official Charts)	1
US Afrobeats Songs (Billboard)	5
US Hot Gospel Songs (Billboard)	2

== Release history ==
Release dates and formats for "In the Dark"
Region	Date	Format	Label	Ref.
Various	March 19, 2026	Digital download; streaming	GIRAN Republic; Empire	
