= Amapiano (song) =

Song by Asake and Olamide

Single by Asake and Olamide

from the album Work of Art
- Language: English; Yoruba; Nigerian Pidgin
- Released: 24 May 2023
- Genre: Afrofusion
- Length: 3:29
- Label: YBNL Nation
- Songwriters: Ahmed Ololade; Olamide Adedeji
- Producer: Magicsticks

Asake singles chronology
"2:30" (2023)	"Amapiano" (2023)	"New Religion" (2023)

Olamide singles chronology
"Trumpet" (2022)	"Amapiano" (2023)	"New Religion" (2023)

"Amapiano" is a song by Nigerian musician Asake and Nigerian rapper Olamide. The song is a single from Asake's second studio album, Work of Art, and was produced by Nigerian producer Magicsticks. The music video, shot by Jyde Ajala, was released on 24 May 2023. The song was a surprise release and gained over 100,000 streams within less than 24 hours of its release and debuted at number one of the Spotify Top Songs Nigeria Daily Chart. The song was nominated for Best African Music Performance at the 66th Grammy awards. It was one of the most streamed songs of 2023 on Audiomack, garnering 87.7 million streams on the platform. Former US president Barack Obama listed the song among his favorite music of 2023.

== Background ==
The song paid homage to amapiano, by incorporating reinterpreted log drum elements commonly used in or associated with the South African genre and other African musical styles, in that year.

== Composition ==
The song is described as "easy listen that evokes feelings of happiness and overall summer vibes". Collins Badewa of Style Rave describes the song as "an infectious blend of energetic beats, vibrant melodies, and catchy hooks". Additionally, it is noted for incorporating elements from hip hop, amapiano, Afrobeats, deep house, and a neo-fuji aesthetic, resulting in a distinctive rhythmic energy. Douglas Markowitz of Grammy Awards wrote that while the song pays homage to the amapiano genre, it rearranges some elements such as the iconic log drum. The fusion song predominantly features numerous genre elements, in a crossover style, resulting in a track that is primarily Afro-fusion. The lyrics are primarily in Yoruba language and pidgin and bits of English.

== Reception ==
Dennis Ade Peter of OkayAfrica wrote,

All the bells and whistles of an Asake song are present, a maximalist canvas that includes warm piano keys, gorgeously droning violin, interpolated organ notes, log drums that mimic the staggering groove of Omele drums, and a bevy of stacked vocals in call-and-response mode. If anyone needs the clearest vision of what 'piano-inflected neo-Fuji' is, you'd be hard-pressed to find a better one than "Amapiano".

The Africa Report listed "Amapiano" as one of the top music hits of 2023.

== Certifications ==
Certifications for "Amapiano"
Region	Certification	Certified units/sales
United Kingdom (BPI)	Silver	200,000^{‡}
^{‡} Sales+streaming figures based on certification alone.
