= Lonely at the Top (song) =

- H.E.R. remix cover

Single by Asake and H.E.R.

from the album Work of Art
- Language: English; Yoruba
- Released: 15 November 2023
- Genre: Afro fusion; Afropop; Afrobeats
- Length: 2:37
- Label: YBNL Nation
- Songwriters: Ahmed Ololade; Olamide Adedeji
- Lyricist: Ahmed Ololade
- Producer: Blaisebeatz

Asake singles chronology
"New Religion" (2023)	"Lonely at the Top" (2023)	"Only Me" (2024)

"Lonely at the Top" is a song by Nigerian artist Asake from his second studio album Work of Art (2023). The song was released on 16 June 2023, through YBNL Nation and Empire Distribution. It was the first song to hit 100 million streams on Audiomack. As of September 2023, the song was the longest-running number-one song on Nigerian Radio Chart. It was also number one on the TurnTable Official Top 100, an aggregate chart that combines TV, radio and streaming platforms. It spent 12 weeks at number one. It was also one of the most streamed songs on Spotify in Nigeria.

It was also the most searched song of 2023 in Nigeria.

On 15 November 2023, a remix of the song with American R&B singer H.E.R. was released. In April 2024, British rapper Stormzy sampled the song in his track "Cry No More", featuring British rapper Headie One.

== Background ==
The song addresses the feelings of loneliness, emptiness and distrust associated with success and therefore being at the top.

Kareem of The Guardian in Nigeria explains that the song explores themes of ambition and resilience in Asake's pursuit of success, making the song relatable. Asake mentions the challenges he faced in the pursuit of success through lyrics like "I would cheer on the road chasing my dream because I know no one can chase it for me" Alexis Petridis of The Guardian explains that the lyrics suggest that Asake is unbothered by the alienating effects of fame and looks forward to being an even greater celebrity

== Composition ==
The song produced by Blaisebeatz is described to have a "backing choir" and "introspective instrumentation". Tomide Marv of Zikoko Magazine described "Lonely at the Top" as a solemn but groovy song.

== Critical reception ==
Rolling Stone named it as one of the best 40 Afropop songs of 2023, terming it as a refreshing detour from the usual amapiano sound that Asake is known for.

== Live performances ==
In July 2023, Asake performed a live medley of "Lonely at the Top" on Vevo Ctrl. In November 2023, Asake and H.E.R, had an acoustic performance of the remix which was uploaded on YouTube On 1 February 2024, Asake performed the song on The Late Show with Stephen Colbert.

== Track listing ==
Lonely at the Top EP
No.	Title	Writer(s)	Producer(s)	Length
1.	"Lonely at the Top" (remix; featuring H.E.R.)	Ahmed Ololade; Olamide Adedeji; Gabriella Wilson	Blaisebeatz	2:37
2.	"Lonely at the Top" (acoustic; featuring H.E.R.)	Ololade; Adedeji; Wilson	Blaisebeatz	2:40
3.	"Lonely at the Top" (dance remix)	Ololade; Adedeji	Moody Jones; Clayton William; Mike Kerrigan	3:10
4.	"Lonely at the Top"	Ololade; Adedeji	Blaisebeatz	2:37
Total length:				11:05

== Certifications ==
Certifications for "Lonely at the Top"
Region	Certification	Certified units/sales
Nigeria (TCSN)	8× Platinum	800,000^{‡}
United Kingdom (BPI)	Silver	200,000^{‡}
^{‡} Sales+streaming figures based on certification alone.
