= Lungu Boy =

2024 Album by Asake

Studio album by Asake
- Released: 9 August 2024
- Genre: Fuji-techno, neo fuji, fuji, afrofusion, afropiano
- Length: 48:07
- Language: Yoruba; English
- Label: YBNL; Empire
- Producer: Magicsticks; Mike Dean; P.Priime; Sak Pase; Sarz

Asake chronology
Work of Art (2023)	Lungu Boy (2024)	Real, Vol. 1 (2026)

Singles from Lungu Boy
- 1. "Wave" Released: 21 June 2024; 2. "Active" Released: 7 August 2024

Lungu Boy is the third studio album by Nigerian singer Asake. A follow-up to his previous album, Work of Art (2023), the album was released on 9 August 2024 through YBNL Nation and Empire Distribution. The album also contains guest appearances from Wizkid, Travis Scott, Stormzy, Central Cee and Ludmilla, alongside production from P.Priime, Magicsticks, Mike Dean, Sarz, Sak Pase and promoted by Olaitan Salaudeen.

== Release and promotion ==
On 10 June 2024 Asake announced his Lungu Boy World Tour alongside the album. On 21 June 2024, Asake released the album's lead single, "Wave" with Central Cee, followed by its official music video on the same day and was plugged by Olaitan. On 5 August, Asake shared the album's official tracklist, previewing guest appearances from Central Cee, Ludmilla, Stormzy, Travis Scott and Wizkid.

== Critical reception ==
Professional ratings
Review scores
Source	Rating
African Folder	7.4/10
The Daily Telegraph	4/5 stars
The Guardian	4/5 stars
NME	3/5 stars
Rolling Stone	3.5/5 stars
Afrocritik	6.4/10

Lungu Boy received mostly positive reviews from music critics. Luke Seaman and Poppie Platt of The Daily Telegraph's review awarded the album four out of five stars, characterising it as a "musical experiment" and commending Asake for his innovative approach. Writing for The Guardian, Ben Beaumont-Thomas gave the album the same score, praising the album as an impressive wave of West African pop. However, he also noted that it was not as strong as Asake's second studio album, Work of Art.

Rolling Stone's Mankaprr Conteh rated the record three and a half stars, writing: "Lungu Boy keeps the faith but explores new sounds, becoming Asake's most rhythmically and emotionally diverse album yet, with some experiments more successful than others."

However, NME's Kyann-Sian Williams only awarded Lungu Boy three stars in a more mixed review. They praised Asake for "still rewriting the rulebook on Afro-pop", but questioned why it took some time to "get to the good stuff". In a 6.4/10 review, Abioye Damilare Samson of Afrocritik reviewed that, "Lungu Boy struggles to present a cohesive portrayal of Asake's journey; while it seeks to chronicle his identity, it thematically omits the key aspects of his narrative."

== Track listing ==
Lungu Boy track listing
No.	Title	Writer(s)	Producer(s)	Length
1.	"Start"	Ahmed Ololade	P.Priime	1:21
2.	"MMS" (with Wizkid)	Ololade; Ayodeji Balogun	P.Priime	3:39
3.	"Mood"	Ololade	P.Priime	2:51
4.	"My Heart"	Ololade	P.Priime	3:17
5.	"Worldwide"	Ololade	Sarz	3:02
6.	"Active" (with Travis Scott)	Ololade; Jacques Webster II; Douglas Ford; Olumuyiwa Olofinkuade Olajide	Mike Dean; Sarz	2:53
7.	"Suru" (with Stormzy)	Ololade; Michael Owuo Jr.	P.Priime	3:40
8.	"Skating"	Ololade	P.Priime	2:56
9.	"Wave" (with Central Cee)	Ololade; Oakley Caesar-Su	Magicsticks	3:25
10.	"Mentally"	Ololade	Sarz	3:17
11.	"Uhh Yeahh"	Ololade	Sarz	3:24
12.	"I Swear"	Ololade	P.Priime	3:04
13.	"Ligali"	Ololade	Sarz	2:53
14.	"Whine" (with Ludmilla)	Ololade; Ludmila Oliveira da Silva	Sak Pase	2:58
15.	"Fuji Vibe"	Ololade	Magicsticks	5:22
Total length:				48:07

== Charts ==
Chart performance for Lungu Boy
Chart (2024)	Peak position
Belgian Albums (Ultratop Flanders)	167
Belgian Albums (Ultratop Wallonia)	194
Canadian Albums (Billboard)	54
Irish Albums (OCC)	42
Nigerian Albums (TurnTable)	1
Swiss Albums (Schweizer Hitparade)	97
UK Albums (OCC)	15
UK R&B Albums (OCC)	34
US Independent Albums (Billboard)	20
US Billboard 200	115
US World Albums (Billboard)	4

== Release history ==
Release history and formats for Lungu Boy
Region	Date	Format	Label
Various	9 August 2024	CD; digital download; streaming	YBNL Nation; Empire Distribution
