= Temmie Ovwasa =

Nigerian singer

- Also known as: YBNL Princess
- Born: 29 November 1996 (age 29); Ilorin, Kwara State, Nigeria
- Genres: Alternative R&B
- Occupations: Singer; songwriter
- Years active: 2016–present

Temmie Ovwasa (born 29 November 1996), popularly known as YBNL Princess, is a Nigerian alternative R&B singer. They signed a record deal with YBNL Nation in August 2015 but left the label in 2020 after a disagreement with the label owner, Olamide. Ovwasa is openly lesbian and is non-binary. In 2020, they released the first openly gay album in Nigeria.

== Early life ==
Ovwasa was born on 29 November, 1996 in Ilorin to a father from Delta State and mother from Osun State. They completed their basic education at Grace Christian Schools and their secondary education at Dalex Royal College, both in Ilorin, Kwara State. Ovwasa studied Medical Anatomy at Ladoke Akintola University of Technology.

== Career ==
Ovwasa started singing at the age of eight when they wrote their first song and joined their church choir. Recognizing their musical talent, their mother gave them their first guitar at age 12. Ovwasa gained prominence in 2015 when Olamide reached out to them via Instagram, leading to a signing with YBNL record label and earning them the name YBNL Princess. They later left YBNL after a disagreement with the label boss.

== Discography ==
=== Album ===
- Ajijobo; The Art of Ruining Your Reputation (2024)
- Space Fuji (2022)
- Songs From the Closet (2021)
- E Be Like Say Dem Swear For Me (2020)

=== Singles ===
- Afefe (2016)
- Jabole (2016)
- Bamidele (2017)
- Holy Water (2018)
- Osunwemimo (2020)
- Elejo wewe (2020)
