= Palazzo (song) =

Single by Spinall featuring Asake

from the album Top Boy
- Released: May 13, 2022
- Genre: Afrobeats
- Label: TheCAPMusic
- Songwriters: Sodamola Oluseye Desmond; Ahmed Ololade; Olamide
- Producers: Spinall; Magicsticks

Spinall singles chronology
"CLOUD 9" (2021)	"Palazzo" (2022)	"Fididi" (2022)

Music video
- "Palazzo" on YouTube

"Palazzo" is a song by a Nigerian disc jockey Spinall, featuring Asake. It was released on 13 May 2022 through TheCAPMusic. Spinall and Asake wrote the song, and Spinall produced it with Magicsticks, and sound engineer Eskeez. "Palazzo" earned Spinall his third UK Afrobeats Singles Chart entry at number 6, and earned Asake third entry on the chart. It also earned Spinall his first entry on the Billboard U.S. Afrobeats Songs at number 6, and earned Asake, his third entry on the chart. The song was ranked at number 1 on TheCable's list of 10 TCL radio pick of the week, and debuted on number 2 on the TurnTable Top 50 chart.

In a review for BellaNaija, the author called the song a "certified party starter".

== Background ==
Magicsticks served as the producer of "Palazzo", with Spinall, who served as the co-producer. The song features Asake, credited as a featured artist, and songwriter, with guest Olamide, who served as a co-writer, and oversaw the music production. "Palazzo" was released on 13 May 2022 as the lead single from Spinall's studio album.

On 13 May 2022, he released the official music video to "Palazzo", shot and directed by TG Omori.

== Commercial performance ==
During its debut week, on 13 May 2022, "Palazzo" peaked at number 86 on Apple Music Top 100 Global Songs Chart. "Palazzo" also debut at number 4 in Nigeria, 37 in Dominica, 44 in Ghana, 46 in Gambia, 61 in Ireland, 70 in Niger, 76 in UAE, and 77 in Kenya, on Apple Music. On 22 May 2022, it debuted at number 6 on the UK Afrobeats Singles chart, and reached number 4. On 23 May 2022, it debuted at number 2 on the Nigeria TurnTable Top 50 chart. On 25 May 2022, it debuted at number 6 on the Billboard U.S. Afrobeats Songs chart, number 3 on TurnTable Top 50 Streaming Songs chart, and number 8 on TurnTable Top 50 Airplay.

== Credits and personnel ==
- Spinall – primary artist, songwriting, production
- Asake – lead vocals, songwriting
- Olamide - songwriting
- Magicsticks – production
- Eskeez – mixing, mastering

== Charts ==
Chart performance for "Palazzo"
Chart (2022)	Peak position
Nigeria (TurnTable Top 50)	2
US Afrobeats (Billboard)	6
UK Afrobeats (Official Charts)	4

== Release history ==
Release history for "Palazzo"
Region	Date	Format	Label	Ref.
Various	13 May 2022	Digital download; streaming	TheCapMusic	
