= Real, Vol. 1 =

EP by Wizkid and Asake
- Released: 23 January 2026
- Genre: Afrobeats; afro-fusion
- Length: 10:46
- Label: Starboy; Giran Republic; Empire
- Producer: Magicsticks; 4Tunes; LOL

Wizkid chronology
Morayo (2024)	Real, Vol. 1 (2026)

Asake chronology
Lungu Boy (2024)	Real, Vol. 1 (2026)	M$ney (2026)

Singles from Real, Vol. 1
- 1. "Jogodo" Released: 16 January 2026

Real, Vol. 1 is a collaborative EP by Nigerian singers Wizkid and Asake. It was released on 23 January 2026, by the former's label Starboy Entertainment, the latter's Giran Republic, and Empire Distribution. The EP's production was primarily handled by Magicsticks, with assistance from 4Tunes and LOL. Real, Vol. 1 received mixed reviews from music critics, who praised its production and their chemistry but criticized its songwriting depth and predictable structure.

== Background ==
The pair had previously worked together on "MMS" from Asake's 2024 album Lungu Boy and "Bad Girl" from Wizkid's 2024 project Morayo, which helped raise anticipation for a full joint release. Prior to the EP's release, Wizkid and Asake also shared live performance spaces, including Asake's Red Bull Symphonic concert in Brooklyn in 2025. Wizkid first announced Real, Vol. 1 during an Apple Music Takeover in late 2025, with plans for a December release that was later postponed, leading to reactions from fans on X following the delay.

== Singles ==
On 16 January 2026, Wizkid and Asake released "Jogodo" as the EP's lead single. Produced by Magicsticks, the song was released alongside the unveiling of the EP's cover art and tracklist. The track blends Afrobeats with percussion and brass elements and is sung primarily in Nigerian Pidgin, centering on the theme of intoxication or being under the influence. Tšeliso Monaheng of OkayAfrica characterized "Jogodo" as "a conversation between two friends assured of their talents, comfortable enough to test the outer limits of their artistry in each other's presence."

He added that the track, produced by Magicsticks, "taps into the percussive drive of amapiano to create something magnetic, a groove laced with soul-stirring momentum," and called it "a moment in time that feels destined to inform what comes next." Omotoyosi Idowu of Premium Times gave "Jogodo" a 7/10, calling it a blend of smooth harmonies and solid beats. He said Wizkid and Asake send "an affectionate message to a lover," with erotic lyrics expressing desire, while praising Wizkid's steady vocals and Asake's use of local dialects. He also said that the song sexualizes women's bodies but described the overall sound as balanced and enjoyable.

== Composition ==
Real, Vol. 1 is an Afrobeats EP that incorporates elements of amapiano, Afro-Cuban jazz, Latin pop, and Afro-house, featuring percussion, brass, and log-drums. The opener, "Turbulence," has a mid-tempo groove with Asake delivering reflective verses and Wizkid providing melodic vocals. "Jogodo" is sung in Nigerian Pidgin and addresses themes of love, desire, and assurance. The track features pulsing percussion, brass, and log-drums, with alternating vocals from Wizkid and Asake. "Iskolodo" contains horn and string arrangements with Afro-Cuban and Latin influences. It has a call-and-response structure and lyrics that focus on confidence, fame, and wealth. The closing track, "Alaye", is a party-oriented song with log-drums, synths, and Afro-house elements, describing celebrations, fashion, and luxury.

== Critical reception ==
Professional ratings
Review scores
Source	Rating
Premium Times	5/10
The Native	6.4/10
Afrocritik	6.5/10
Pulse Nigeria	7.0/10

Real, Vol. 1 was met with mixed reception from music critics. Pulse Nigeria's Adeayo Adebiyi said that Real, Vol. 1 stayed within Wizkid's familiar sound, noting that there was "no disappointment in the expected" and concluding that the EP was "sufficiently enjoyable" despite unmet expectations, rating it 7.0 out of 10. Abioye Damilare Samson, a writer for the Nigerian music website Afrocritik, stated that the EP "breaks little new ground for a marquee collaboration of this calibre" and concluding that it should "push boundaries, challenge conventions, and showcase artistic growth" and it "doesn't quite do that," rating it 6.5 out of 10.

Boluwatife Adeyemi of The Native wrote that Real, Vol. 1 leaned on history and friendship rather than risk, saying "this palpable personal chemistry has not fully resulted in a resonant musical synergy," calling "Jogodo" a "passable tune," and concluding that the EP felt like "a satisfying cross-generational dialogue that's indisputably authentic to the genre," rating it 6.4 out of 10. Omotoyosi Idowu of Premium Times said that the album met surface expectations but lacked depth, explaining that the EP "lacks profound lyricism or exceptional songwriting" and concluding that "the total output of their first collaboration falls short of expectations," rating it 5 out of 10.

== Track listing ==
Real, Vol. 1 track listing
No.	Title	Writer(s)	Producer(s)	Length
1.	"Turbulence"	Ayodeji Balogun; Ahmed Ololade	Magicsticks; 4Tunes	2:25
2.	"Jogodo"	Balogun; Ololade	Magicsticks	3:08
3.	"Iskolodo"	Balogun; Ololade	Magicsticks; LOL	2:36
4.	"Alaye"	Balogun; Ololade	Magicsticks	2:35
Total length:				10:46

== Personnel ==
- Ayodeji "Wizkid" Balogun – vocals, writing
- Ahmed "Asake" Ololade – vocals, writing
- Magicsticks – production, mixing, mastering (1–4)
- 4Tunes – production (1)
- LOL – production (3)
- Liz Robson - recording (1–4)
- Nick Cavalieri – mixing (1–4)
- Aidan Duncan – recording (1)

== Charts ==
Chart (2026)	Peak position
Nigerian Albums (TurnTable)	1

== Release history ==
Release history and formats for Real, Vol. 1
Region	Date	Format	Label
Worldwide	23 January 2026	Streaming; digital download	Starboy; Giran Republic; Empire
