= 2:30 =

Single by Asake

from the album Work of Art
- Language: English; Nigerian Pidgin; Yoruba
- Released: 5 April 2023
- Genre: Afrobeats
- Length: 2:18
- Label: YBNL Nation; Empire
- Songwriters: Ahmed Ololade; Olamide Adedeji
- Producers: Magicsticks; Blaisebeatz

Asake singles chronology
"Yoga" (2023)	"2:30" (2023)	"Amapiano" (2023)

Music video
- "2:30" on YouTube

"2:30" is a song by Nigerian singer Asake. It was released on 5 April 2023, through YBNL Nation and Empire Distribution as the second single from his second studio album Work of Art (2023). It was produced by Magicsticks and Blaisebeatz.

== Composition ==
"2:30" combines simmering percussion with synths described by Rolling Stone as "straight out of a dingy basement," a texture that underscores the song's raw and unfiltered energy. Produced by Magicsticks and Blaisebeatz, the track draws from Asake's street-pop roots, celebrating his authenticity and individuality.

== Music video ==
The music video for "2:30" coincided with the song's release. It was shot in Los Angeles and was directed by Edgar Esteves and Joshua Valle, and produced by Blank Square Productions.

== Commercial performance ==
"2:30" debuted at No. 22 on the Official Nigeria Top 100 chart during the week of 7 April 2023. During the week of 17 April 2023, it amassed 5.23 million on-demand streams (No. 1 on streaming) and a radio reach of 65 million impressions (No. 5 on radio). This marked Asake's ninth top-ten entry on the chart, setting a record for the most top-ten singles in Nigeria since the chart's inception in November 2020. The song's streaming figures nearly doubled that of the next highest-ranked track, Davido's "Unavailable," which recorded 2.84 million streams.

The following week, it quickly rose to No. 1. "2:30" maintained its No. 1 position for a second consecutive week, tallying 3.08 million streams and 72.7 million radio impressions, becoming Asake's third song of 2023 to log multiple weeks at the summit.

By its third week (ending 27 April 2023), the song remained at No. 1, with 2.94 million streams (No. 2 on streaming) and 82 million radio impressions (No. 2 on radio), extending Asake’s record for his longest chart-topping run as a lead artist.

In its fourth week on the chart (week ending 12 May 2023), "2:30" rebounded to No. 1, recording 78.4 million in radio reach (No. 1 on radio) and 2.28 million streams (No. 3 on streaming). It became the first of Asake’s songs to spend four weeks at the summit. However, by the following week, the track fell to No. 3 after being displaced by Rema’s "Charm" and Kizz Daniel’s "Shu-Peru."

== Charts ==
Chart performance for "2:30"
Chart (2023)	Peak position
Nigeria Top 100 (TurnTable)	1
UK Official Singles Chart Update (OCC)	88
UK Afrobeats (Official Charts)	2
US Afrobeats Songs (Billboard)	8

== Certifications ==
Certifications for "2:30"
Region	Certification	Certified units/sales
Nigeria (TCSN)	4× Platinum	400,000^{‡}
^{‡} Sales+streaming figures based on certification alone.

== Personnel ==
Credits adapted from Apple Music.

- Ahmed Ololade - vocals, songwriting
- Olamide Adedeji – songwriting
- Magicsticks - production, mixing, mastering
- Blaisebeatz - production
- B.Banks - recording engineer
- Nicholas Cavaleri - engineer

== Release history ==
Release history and formats for "2:30"
Region	Date	Format	Label
Various	5 April 2023	Streaming; digital download	YBNL Nation; Empire
