= Active (song) =

2024 single by Asake and Travis Scott

Single by Asake and Travis Scott

from the album Lungu Boy
- Language: English; Yoruba
- Released: 6 August 2024
- Genre: Bounce; hip house
- Length: 2:53
- Label: YBNL Nation; Empire
- Songwriters: Ahmed Ololade; Jacques Webster II; Douglas Ford; Jazzman Olofin
- Producers: Mike Dean; Sarz

Asake singles chronology
"Wave" (2024)	"Active" (2024)	"C'mon Look!" (2024)

Travis Scott singles chronology
"Oh Shhh..." (2024)	"Active" (2024)	"Drugs You Should Try It" (2024)

Music video
- "Active" on YouTube

"Active" is a song by Nigerian singer Asake and American rapper and singer Travis Scott. It was released on 6 August 2024 through YBNL Nation and Empire Distribution as the second and final single from Asake's third studio album, Lungu Boy. The song was produced by Mike Dean and Sarz, while it samples "Raise Da Roof" by Jazzman Olofin.

== Composition ==
"Active" blends Afrobeats and trap with house and fuji music influences. Lyrically, the song explores themes of strength and literal activity or being active, as suggested by the title and both rappers "offer up slick flows in their native languages". Featuring a recurring vocal chop sampled from "Raise Da Roof" the 2006 crossover hit single by Jazzman Olofin and Adewale Ayuba, it highlights the ongoing theme of Asake’s commitment to integrating traditional Nigerian art forms into his music and emphasizes his adaptation of fuji music’s stylistic techniques.

Travis Scott gives a notable shout-out to Ikeja, the capital of Lagos State, stipulating "from the H to Ikeja" and adapts his typical flow to complement Asake's style.

== Music video ==
The music video for "Active" was directed by Edgar Esteves, Josh Valle and Nikita Vilchinski in New York City. In the video, Asake immerses himself in American culture, transitioning from equestrianism to socializing at a skatepark. He also engages with a marching band, unleashes fury on a car with a crowbar, and visits a strip club alongside, Travis Scott.

== Charts ==
Chart performance for "Active"
Chart (2024)	Peak position
Canada Hot 100 (Billboard)	95
Global 200 (Billboard)	176
Ireland (IRMA)	88
New Zealand Hot Singles (RMNZ)	13
Nigeria (TurnTable Top 100)	7
UK Singles (Official Charts)	58
UK Afrobeats (Official Charts)	1
UK Indie (Official Charts)	10
UK Hip Hop/R&B (Official Charts)	9
US Afrobeats Songs (Billboard)	1
US Rhythmic Airplay (Billboard)	31
US World Digital Song Sales (Billboard)	1

== Certifications ==
Certifications for "Active"
Region	Certification	Certified units/sales
Nigeria (TCSN)	2× Platinum	200,000^{‡}
^{‡} Sales+streaming figures based on certification alone.
