= Morayo =

Yoruba name

- Language: Yoruba

Origin
- Origin: Nigerian
- Meaning: I have found joy
- Region of origin: South-West Nigeria

Moráyọ̀ audio is a Nigerian given name of Yoruba origin which means "I have found joy". The name originated from the Southwestern part of Nigeria.

== Notable people bearing the name ==
- Morayo Afolabi-Brown, Nigerian TV host
- Ifedayo Adetifa (Ifedayo Morayo Adetifa), Nigerian paediatrician
