= TurnTable Top 100 Albums =

Nigerian albums chart

Nigeria Official Top 100 Albums
- The current TurnTable Top 100 chart
- Formation: 8 November 2022; 3 years ago
- Purpose: To award trending top albums
- Services: record chart
- Owner: TurnTable
- Website: top50

The TurnTable Top 100 Albums chart (also known as Nigeria Official Top 100 Albums) is the official album streaming chart in Nigeria. It is compiled every Tuesday by a Nigeria-based music digital streaming tracking company and published every Tuesday by TurnTable magazine. The list shows the 50 top-streaming music albums of the moment in Nigeria. The first issue of the Nigeria Top 50, was launched on Tuesday, 8 November 2022, and the first number-one album was Mr. Money with the Vibe by Asake.

In 2024, the chart ranking was later expanded from 50 to 100. The first issue of the Top 100, was launched on Monday, 29 January 2024, and was led by Seyi Vibez's NAHAMciaga extended play album.

== History ==
On 31 March 2022, TurnTable announced the expansion of the TurnTable Top 50 Songs chart, into Top 100. According to the co-founder, and editor-in-chief of the magazine, Ayomide Oriowo, "The chart expansion will be supported by TurnTable Top 200, as the official album-based chart". On 8 November 2022, the album's official chart, began operation as the current TurnTable Top 50 chart.

The chart rankings are based on streams data from YouTube, Boomplay Music, Audiomack, Apple Music, Deezer, and Spotify in Nigeria. On 11 November 2022, the chart eventually became the one main all-genre albums chart, following the launch of the seven genre component of the TurnTable Nigerian Top 50 Albums chart; which include:

- Afro-Pop Albums
- Afro-R&B Albums
- Hip-Hop/Rap Albums
- Street-Pop Albums
- Gospel Albums
- Traditional Albums
- Alternative Albums

On 9 February 2024, TurnTable announced the expansion of the chart, intending to provide more in-depth insights into album chart performances, celebrate successes, and highlight distinctive achievements.

== Policy ==
The chart retains a similar system to the existing Top Streaming Songs chart, which is a point-per-play system that determines the values of streams on different streaming platforms. Paid streams will be weighted as one point per play value, freemium streams will be weighted as 0.75 points per play, ad-supported video streams from YouTube will be weighted as 0.66 points per play while ad-supported streams will be weighted as 0.5 points per play. The album chart as well as other genre-based consumption-ranked album charts will employ a single tier (equating 1,500 streams as one album unit) for on-demand audio streams (paid or ad-supported) from subscription services. Video streams will also contribute to the Top 50 Albums Chart.

== Number ones ==
=== 2022 ===
Issue date	Album	Artist(s)
October 31	Mr. Money With The Vibe	Asake
November 7	Mr. Money With The Vibe	Asake
November 14	More Love, Less Ego	Wizkid
November 21	Mr. Money With The Vibe	Asake
November 28	Mr. Money With The Vibe	Asake
December 5	Mr. Money With The Vibe	Asake
December 12	Billion Dollar Baby 2.0	Seyi Vibez
December 19	Billion Dollar Baby 2.0	Seyi Vibez
December 26	Billion Dollar Baby 2.0	Seyi Vibez

=== 2023 ===
Issue date	Album	Artist(s)
January 2	Billion Dollar Baby 2.0	Seyi Vibez
January 9	Billion Dollar Baby 2.0	Seyi Vibez
January 16	Billion Dollar Baby 2.0	Seyi Vibez
January 23	Billion Dollar Baby 2.0	Seyi Vibez
January 30	Billion Dollar Baby 2.0	Seyi Vibez
February 6	Billion Dollar Baby 2.0	Seyi Vibez
February 13	Billion Dollar Baby 2.0	Seyi Vibez
February 20	Billion Dollar Baby 2.0	Seyi Vibez
February 27	Billion Dollar Baby 2.0	Seyi Vibez
March 6	Billion Dollar Baby 2.0	Seyi Vibez
March 13	Billion Dollar Baby 2.0	Seyi Vibez
March 20	Mr. Money With The Vibe	Asake
March 27	Mr. Money With The Vibe	Asake
April 3	Timeless	Davido
April 10	Timeless	Davido
April 17	Timeless	Davido
April 24	Timeless	Davido
May 1	Timeless	Davido
May 8	Timeless	Davido
May 15	Timeless	Davido
May 22	Timeless	Davido
May 29	Timeless	Davido
June 5	Timeless	Davido
June 12	Vibe Till Thy Kingdom Come	Seyi Vibez
June 19	Work Of Art	Asake
June 26	Work Of Art	Asake
July 3	Work Of Art	Asake
July 10	Work Of Art	Asake
July 17	Work Of Art	Asake
July 24	Work Of Art	Asake
July 31	Work Of Art	Asake
August 7	Work Of Art	Asake
August 14	Unruly	Olamide
August 21	Work Of Art	Asake
August 28	I Told Them...	Burna Boy
September 1	I Told Them...	Burna Boy
September 8	I Told Them...	Burna Boy
September 15	Blessed	MohBad
September 22	Blessed	MohBad
September 29	Blessed	MohBad
October 6	EZIOKWU	Odumodublvck
October 13	EZIOKWU	Odumodublvck
October 20	EZIOKWU	Odumodublvck
October 27	RAVAGE	Rema
November 3	EZIOKWU	Odumodublvck
November 10	Presido La Pluto	Shallipopi
November 17	Presido La Pluto	Shallipopi
November 24	Presido La Pluto	Shallipopi
December 1	EZIOKWU (UNCUT)	Odumodublvck
December 8	NAHAMciaga - EP	Seyi Vibez
December 15	NAHAMciaga - EP	Seyi Vibez
December 22	S2 - EP	Wizkid
December 29	Presido La Pluto	Shallipopi

=== 2024 ===
Issue date	Album	Artist(s)
January 5	NAHAMciaga - EP	Seyi Vibez
January 12	NAHAMciaga - EP	Seyi Vibez
January 19	NAHAMciaga - EP	Seyi Vibez
January 26	NAHAMciaga - EP	Seyi Vibez
February 7	NAHAMciaga - EP	Seyi Vibez
February 14	NAHAMciaga - EP	Seyi Vibez
February 21	NAHAMciaga - EP	Seyi Vibez
February 28	NAHAMciaga - EP	Seyi Vibez
March 7	NAHAMciaga - EP	Seyi Vibez
March 14	TZA	Kizz Daniel
March 21	TZA	Kizz Daniel
March 28	TZA	Kizz Daniel
April 4	TZA	Kizz Daniel
April 11	TZA	Kizz Daniel
April 18	Skakespopi - EP	Shallipopi
April 25	Skakespopi - EP	Shallipopi
May 2	Skakespopi - EP	Shallipopi
May 9	Vibez Incorporation Mixtape, Vol. 1	Seyi Vibez
May 16	Vibez Incorporation Mixtape, Vol. 1	Seyi Vibez
May 23	Vibez Incorporation Mixtape, Vol. 1	Seyi Vibez
May 30	Vibez Incorporation Mixtape, Vol. 1	Seyi Vibez
June 6	The Year I Turned 21	Ayra Starr
June 13	Vibez Incorporation Mixtape, Vol. 1	Seyi Vibez
June 20	Vibez Incorporation Mixtape, Vol. 1	Seyi Vibez
June 27	Vibez Incorporation Mixtape, Vol. 1	Seyi Vibez
July 4	Ikigai / 生き甲斐, Vol. 1	Olamide
July 11	Ikigai / 生き甲斐, Vol. 1	Olamide
July 18	HEIS	Rema
July 25	HEIS	Rema
August 1	HEIS	Rema
August 8	HEIS	Rema
August 15	Lungu Boy	Asake
August 22	Lungu Boy	Asake
August 29	Lungu Boy	Asake
September 5	Lungu Boy	Asake
September 12	Lungu Boy	Asake
September 19	Lungu Boy	Asake
September 26	Lungu Boy	Asake
October 3	Lungu Boy	Asake
October 10	Lungu Boy	Asake
October 17	Lungu Boy	Asake
October 24	Lungu Boy	Asake
October 31	Lungu Boy	Asake
November 7	Lungu Boy	Asake
November 14	Lungu Boy	Asake
November 21	Lungu Boy	Asake
November 28	Morayo	Wizkid
December 5	Morayo	Wizkid
December 12	Morayo	Wizkid
December 19	Morayo	Wizkid
December 26	Morayo	Wizkid

=== 2025 ===
Issue date	Album	Artist(s)
January 2	Morayo	Wizkid
January 9	Morayo	Wizkid
January 16	Morayo	Wizkid
January 23	Morayo	Wizkid
January 30	Pawon Boy Vol. 1 (Deluxe)	Tml Vibez & DJ 4kerty
February 6	Pawon Boy Vol. 1 (Deluxe)	Tml Vibez & DJ 4kerty
February 13	Morayo	Wizkid
February 20	Morayo	Wizkid
February 27	Children of Africa - EP	Seyi Vibez
March 6	Children of Africa - EP	Seyi Vibez
March 13	Children of Africa - EP	Seyi Vibez
March 20	Children of Africa - EP	Seyi Vibez
March 27	Children of Africa - EP	Seyi Vibez
April 3	THE MACHINE IS COMING	Odumodublvck
April 10	Shakur (Deluxe)	T.I Blaze
April 17	Shakur (Deluxe)	T.I Blaze
April 24	5ive	Davido
May 1	GEN Z	Zinoleesky
May 8	5ive	Davido
May 15	5ive	Davido
May 22	5ive	Davido
May 30	Uncle K: Lemon Chase	Kizz Daniel
June 6	Uncle K: Lemon Chase	Kizz Daniel
June 13	Olamide	Olamide
June 20	Olamide	Olamide
June 27	Olamide	Olamide
July 4	Captain	Bnxn
July 11	No Sign of Weakness	Burna Boy
July 18	No Sign of Weakness	Burna Boy
July 25	No Sign of Weakness	Burna Boy
August 1	Captain	Bnxn
August 8	The Last Wun	Gunna
August 15	Captain	Bnxn
August 22	Captain	Bnxn
August 29	Captain	Bnxn
September 5	Catharsis	Fola
September 12	Catharsis	Fola
September 19	Catharsis	Fola
September 26	Catharsis	Fola
October 3	Industry Machine	Odumodublvck
October 10	Industry Machine	Odumodublvck
October 17	Catharsis	Fola
October 24	Catharsis	Fola
October 31	Catharsis	Fola
November 7	Catharsis	Fola
November 14	Fuji Moto	Seyi Vibez
November 21	Fuji Moto	Seyi Vibez
November 28	Fuji Moto	Seyi Vibez
December 5	Fuji Moto	Seyi Vibez
December 12	Catharsis	Fola
December 19	Catharsis	Fola
December 27	Catharsis	Fola

=== 2026 ===
Issue date	Album	Artist(s)
January 2	Catharsis	Fola
