= Olaitan Salaudeen =

Nigerian music plugger

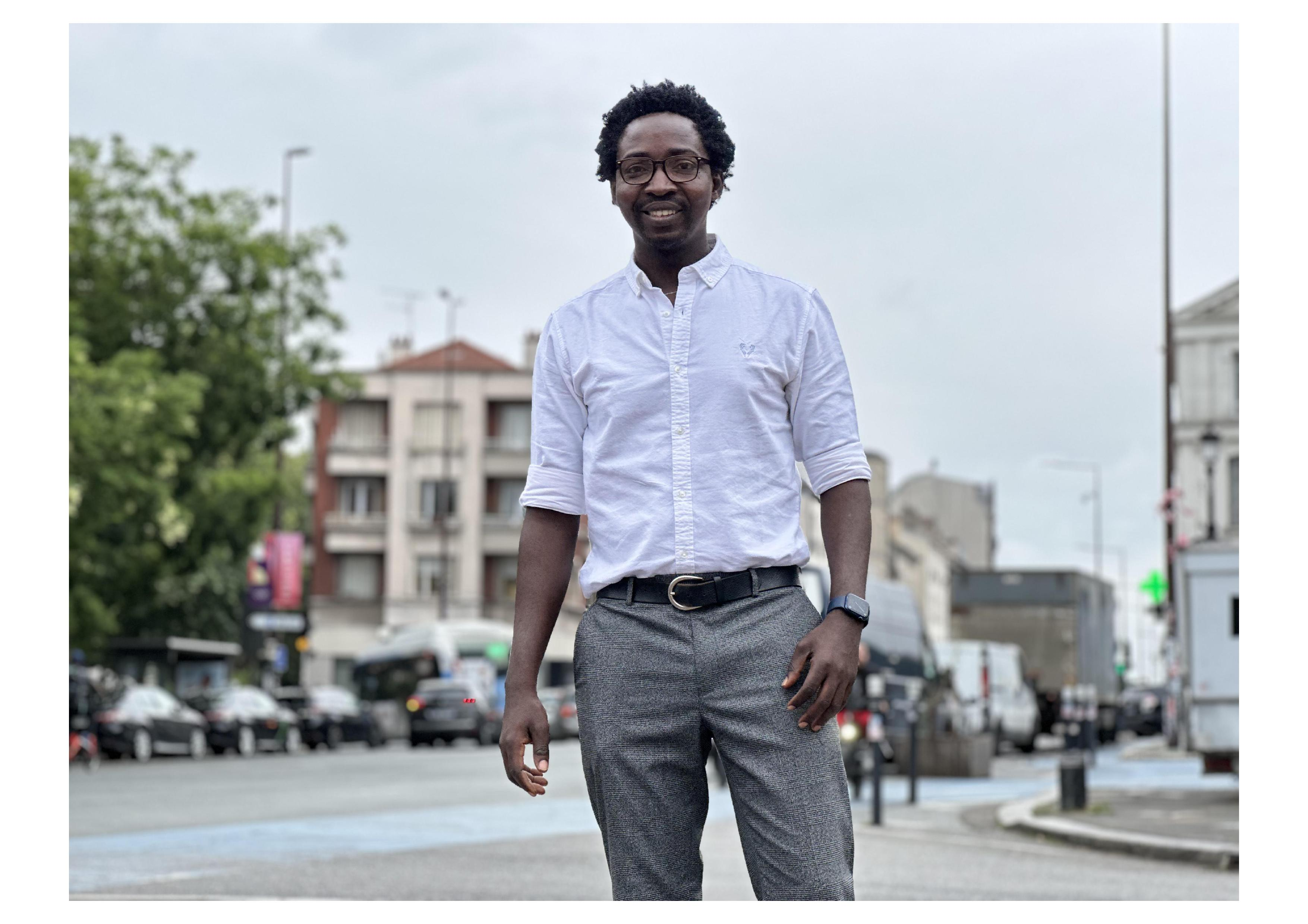
- Born: Olaitan Salaudeen; 6 April 1981 (age 45); Agege, Lagos, Nigeria
- Education: Lagos State Polytechnic
- Occupations: Music promoter; Entrepreneur
- Years active: 2010–present
- Known for: Promoting Nigerian music
- Children: 3
- Website: muchmusiclesstalk.blogspot.com

Sheriff Olaitan Salaudeen (born 6 April 1981), professionally known as Mr. Olaitan and often called Alhaji Sneh, is a Nigerian music promoter. Born in the local area of Agege in Lagos, Nigeria, he is the founder of MuchMusic LessTalk, a promotional and media outreach company focused on Nigerian artists. Salaudeen is also a founding member of the Nigerian record label YBNL Nation, and remains an associate of the label till date.

== Early life and education ==
Salaudeen was born in Agege, Lagos, Nigeria. He attended St. Joseph Secondary School in Idi-Mangoro, Agege, and later studied Mass Communication at Lagos State Polytechnic, graduating in 2008. He completed his National Youth Service Corps (NYSC) program at NTA Minna, Niger State.

== Career ==
After completing his service in the NYSC, Salaudeen began working at Nigeria broadcaster, Television Continental (TVC). In 2010, he launched "MuchMusic LessTalk," focusing on music promotion, with YBNL Nation as a part of this work.

Today, he is most well known for his work improving the digital and media presence of Nigerian artists, particularly through mainstream radio and digital platforms. Salaudeen has been credited with increasing the global recognition of afrobeats, a genre of African dance and hip-hop music widely popularized in Nigeria. His promotional campaigns have coincided with a rise in popularity of several YBNL-affiliated acts. He has worked with musicians including Olamide, Asake, Fireboy DML, 9ice, Reminisce, Small Doctor, Korede Bello, and May D.

== Personal life ==
Salaudeen practices Islam and took Arabic lessons as a teenager. Today he has three children.
