= TurnTable Certification System of Nigeria =

None-trade organization representing the recording industry in Nigeria

- Abbreviation: TCSN
- Predecessor: RCN
- Formation: 2023; 3 years ago
- Type: Music recording certification
- Headquarters: Lagos
- Location: Nigeria
- Founder: Ayomide Oriowo; Similoluwa Adegoke
- Website: www.turntablecharts.com/certification

TurnTable Certification System of Nigeria (TCSN), founded by the Nigeria music magazine TurnTable, to represent the music recording certification in Nigeria based on the number of albums and singles paid streams and digital downloads. The certification is not automatic; for an award to be made, the manager, distributor, or record label must first request certification from its website.

== History ==
On 20 March 2021, TurnTable announced its partnership with the Nigerian music community WeTalkSound, to launch a music recording certification called the Recording Certification of Nigeria (abbreviated as "RCN") to award Gold, Platinum, and Diamond certifications to singles, albums, and videos. Prior to its launch, RCN began operation in March 2021, certifying only music videos with the typical Gold and Platinum benchmarks, awarding gold certifications for 2,500 units, platinum for 5,000 units, and multi-platinum starting from 10,000 units. In a conversation with The Native; Dolapo Amusat, Ayomide Oriowo, Fortune Osayawe, and Similoluwa Adegoke, spoke about growing the music ecosystem in Nigeria and its vision for the Recording Certification of Nigeria in the nearest future.

In August 2021, the Recording Certification of Nigeria became inactive after awarding 92 music videos. On 19 February 2023, Ayomide Oriowo, and Similoluwa Adegoke announce the TurnTable Certification System of Nigeria, as a flagship of TurnTable charts, a music recording chart monitoring Nigeria Top 100 songs, and Top 50 albums. The Nigeria music magazine TurnTable, establish the TurnTable Certification System of Nigeria to award Silver, Gold, Platinum, or Multi-Platinum plaques to eligible songs or albums in Nigeria.

=== "Digital" single certification ===
Digital awards :

- Silver: 25,000 units
- Gold: 50,000 units
- Platinum: 100,000 units
- Multi-Platinum: 200,000 units (increments of 100,000 thereafter)

The units are defined as:

1. 150 on-demand streams count as 1 unit

=== "Digital" album certification ===
Digital awards since 2023:

- Silver: 12,500 units
- Gold: 25,000 units
- Platinum: 50,000 units
- Multi-Platinum: 100,000 units (increments of 50,000 thereafter)

The units are defined as:

1. 1500 on-demand streams count as 1 unit

== TCSN Gold certifications ==
Gold-certified albums and singles

| Year of release | Artist(s) | Title | Label(s) | Certification | Year of certification | Release type |
|---|---|---|---|---|---|---|
| 2022 | Blaqbonez | Back In Uni | Chocolate City | Gold | 2023 | Single |
| 2022 | Burna Boy | Alone | Hollywood Records, Inc./Atlantic Recording Corporation | Gold | 2023 | Single |
| 2021 | Babyboy AV | Confession | Longitude Promotions, Azuri | Gold | 2023 | Single |

== TCSN Platinum certifications ==
Platinum-certified albums and singles

| Year of release | Artist(s) | Title | Label(s) | Certification | Year of certification | Release type |
|---|---|---|---|---|---|---|
| 2022 | Burna Boy | Love, Damini | Spaceship Entertainment Ltd, Atlantic Records | 5× Platinum | 2023 | Album |
| 2022 | Asake | Mr. Money With The Vibe | YBNL Nation, Empire | 4× Platinum | 2023 | Album |
| 2022 | Asake | Sungba (Remix) | YBNL Nation, Empire | 4× Platinum | 2023 | Single |
| 2021 | Joeboy | Sip (Alcohol) | BANKU MUSIC, EMPAWA AFRICA LIMITED | 3× Platinum | 2023 | Single |
| 2022 | Burna Boy | Last Last | Spaceship Entertainment Ltd, Atlantic Records | 3× Platinum | 2023 | Single |
| 2022 | Burna Boy | Common Person | Spaceship Entertainment Ltd, Atlantic Records | 3× Platinum | 2023 | Single |
| 2022 | Burna Boy | For My Hand | Spaceship Entertainment Ltd, Atlantic Records | 2× Platinum | 2023 | Single |
| 2022 | Burna Boy | It's Plenty | Spaceship Entertainment Ltd, Atlantic Records | 2× Platinum | 2023 | Single |
| 2022 | Burna Boy | B.D'or | Spaceship Entertainment Ltd, Atlantic Records | Platinum | 2023 | Single |
| 2022 | Burna Boy | Different Size | Spaceship Entertainment Ltd, Atlantic Records | Platinum | 2023 | Single |
| 2022 | Black Sherif | Second Sermon | Blacko Mgt., Spaceship Entertainment Ltd | Platinum | 2023 | Single |
| 2022 | Burna Boy | I Told Them... | Spaceship Entertainment Ltd, Atlantic Records | Platinum | 2023 | Album |
| 2021 | Joeboy | Somewhere Between Beauty & Magic | BANKU MUSIC, EMPAWA AFRICA LIMITED | Platinum | 2023 | Album |
| 2022 | BNXN | Kilometer (Remix) | To Your Ears Entertainment; Empire | Platinum | 2023 | Single |
| 2021 | Babyboy AV | Big Thug Boys | Longitude Promotions, Azuri | Platinum | 2023 | Single |
