= Audiomack =

Media streaming service

- Logo used since its launch
- Company type: Streaming media
- Available in: English
- Founded: 2012
- Headquarters: New York, United States
- Founders: Dave Macli; David Ponte; Thomas Klinger; Ty Wangsness and Brian Zisook.
- Key people: Dave Macli (CEO)
- Industry: Music, podcast, and video
- Services: Music streaming
- Website: audiomack.com
- Commercial: Yes
- Registration: Required
- Current status: Active
- Native clients on: Web, Android, iOS, Windows, Windows Mobile, BlackBerry OS, macOS, Android TV

Audiomack (stylized in all lowercase) is a music streaming and audio discovery platform that allows artists to upload music and fans to stream and download songs. It is especially popular among emerging artists, offering a space to share their music. The platform supports genres such as hip-hop, R&B, Afrobeats, and Latin music, with a focus on providing a free, user-friendly streaming experience. Audiomack is available as a web-based service and as an app on macOS, Android devices and Windows.

== History ==
Audiomack was co-founded in 2012 by Dave Macli, David Ponte, Thomas Klinger, Ty Wangsness, and Brian Zisook. The platform originally allowed artists to freely share their mixtapes, songs, and albums. In April 2013, J. Cole (Yours Truly 2) and Chance the Rapper (Acid Rap) released new projects exclusively on the platform. In September 2018, Eminem released "Killshot", a diss track about Machine Gun Kelly, exclusively on Audiomack, earning 8.6 million plays in four months. In February, 2019, Nicki Minaj released three songs exclusively on the platform, including a remix of Blueface's "Thotiana."

In November 2020, Audiomack signed a music licensing agreement with Warner Music Group, covering the United States, Canada, Jamaica, and five "key African territories," including Ghana, Kenya, Nigeria, South Africa, and Tanzania. Warner announced an expanded partnership in February 2025, covering 47 additional territories.

In December 2020, Audiomack launched its monetization program, AMP, to all eligible creators based in the United States, Canada, and the United Kingdom. In July 2021, Audiomack expanded the program to creators worldwide and introduced a partnership with Ziiki Media to help promote artists across Africa.

In February 2021, Variety reported Audiomack has music licensing agreements in the United States with Universal Music Group and Sony Music Entertainment. Audiomack also receives music through licensing deals with labels and distributors such as EMPIRE, among others. Also in February 2021, Billboard announced Audiomack streaming data would begin informing some of its flagship charts, including the Hot 100, the Billboard 200, and the Global 200.

In March 2021, Fast Company magazine named Audiomack one of the 10 most innovative companies in music.

In April 2021, Audiomack partnered with telecommunications company MTN Nigeria to offer its 76 million users cheaper data to stream music in its app.

In December 2021, Audiomack launched Supporters, a "feature that will enable loyal fans to tip their favorite artist's music." Fans fund artists or rights holders directly by purchasing 'support badges' for individual song and album releases. Warner Music Group, which was Audiomack's first major label partner, signed on as the first major label participant in "Supporters." Other participating partners include Amuse, AudioSalad Direct, DistroKid, EMPIRE, FUGA, Stem, and Vydia.

In February 2023, Audiomack announced a partnership deal with MTV Base to improve listeners' access to quality music material while raising awareness of African musicians throughout Africa.

In July 2023, Audiomack announced a partnership with Love Renaissance (LVRN), an American record label and management company, to identify emerging musicians.

In April 2024, Audiomack and Merlin announced a "strategic, indie-centric partnership." Through the partnership, Merlin's membership gained access to Audiomack's global audience of engaged listeners.

As of November 2024, Audiomack is reporting 10 million daily active users and 36 million monthly active users globally. This news was reported alongside a partnership announcement with Indian music label Saregama.

On January 21, 2026, Audiomack announced it surpassed 50 million monthly active users, reporting 31 percent year-over-year growth globally.

== Features ==
Offline playback is free to all users and not blocked by a paywall. Users and artists can upload their music to the service through its website. Audiomack uses a combination of audio fingerprinting, DMCA takedown requests, and manual curation to police unauthorized uploads. Audiomack does not limit or charge creators for storing content on its service.

In February 2022, Audiomack launched Creator App, giving its users the ability to "upload new music, analyze data, and connect with fans all in one app." The Creator App surpassed 1 million downloads in spring of 2023.

In May 2023, Audiomack updated its Creator App, adding Promote, "a new tab that provides creators with downloadable assets for marketing and promoting their work." In July 2023, the company announced Connect, a "free, first-of-its-kind feature" that allows creators to message their followers on the service.

Audiomack introduced Audiomod, "a new set of tools that allow users to fiddle with tracks by changing the tempo, modifying the pitch, or swaddling them in reverb," in late 2023. The user-facing feature is the first of its kind in the music streaming space.

In December 2025, Audiomack announced plans to launch a "Pro" tier on its service.

=== Features ===
Music Library Audiomack allows artists to upload their music directly to the platform, making it accessible to listeners for free streaming and downloads. It offers a catalog of millions of songs, ranging from popular tracks by mainstream artists to independent releases. The platform is known for hosting exclusive mixtapes, singles, and albums, especially in hip-hop and Afrobeats genres.

Free and Premium Streaming Audiomack offers a free, ad-supported streaming model, allowing users to stream and download tracks at no cost. The platform also includes a premium subscription, Audiomack Premium, which provides an ad-free experience, higher-quality audio, and the ability to download music for offline listening.

Trending and Charts Audiomack features a trending section that highlights the most popular songs, albums, and playlists based on user engagement and activity. The platform also includes curated playlists and editorial content, helping users discover new music. It offers genre-specific charts, including the Top Songs, Top Albums, and Top Trending tracks across various regions, providing a snapshot of trending music worldwide.

Artist Monetization and Support Audiomack allows artists to earn revenue through its Audiomack Monetization Program (AMP), which is available to select creators. Through AMP, artists can monetize their streams on the platform, offering them a way to generate income from their music without a major label backing. Audiomack also provides promotional tools and analytics to help artists understand their audience and grow their fan base.

=== Accounts and subscriptions ===
As of October 2024, the two Audiomack subscription tiers are:

Type	Remove ads	Mobile listening	Sound quality	Listen offline	Spotify Connect
Audiomack Free	No	Limited (shuffle-only mode)	Up to 160 kbit/s Vorbis or 128 kbit/s Advanced Audio Coding for the web player	Yes	Limited (Audiomack Connect device using the new SDK)
Audiomack Premium	Yes	Yes	Up to 320 kbit/s Vorbis or 256 kbit/s AAC for the web player	Yes	Yes

== Content ==
Audiomack produces several original video content series, including Trap Symphony, with past episodes including Migos, Chief Keef, and Rich the Kid, among others. Other series include Bless The Booth and Fine Tuned, which featuring YNW Melly, among other acts.

In March 2021, Audiomack officially launched Audiomack World, the editorial arm of the company. Users can read articles in the Audiomack app on Android and iOS, as well as their desktop site.

In February 2024, Audiomack introduced You Need To Hear, a global rising artist program. The first artist selected for the series was FOURFIVE, a rapper from New York City.

In 2022, Audiomack launched Keep the Beat Going, an annual campaign aimed at amplifying emerging artists' profiles and introducing them to global markets through billboards in major cities, curated playlists, digital ads, and creator workshops. The campaign has highlighted 72 artists between 2022 and 2024 from countries such as Ghana, Tanzania, Nigeria, South Africa, and Kenya, including notable names like Ayra Starr, Burna Boy, Rema, and Uncle Waffles.

== See also ==
- Music streaming service
- SoundCloud
- Spotify
- Apple Music
- YouTube Music
