= Asake =

Nigerian musician (born 1999)

- Born: Ahmed Ololade; 13 January 1995 (age 31); Lagos State, Nigeria
- Other names: Mr. Money; Lameda; Medoo
- Occupations: Singer; rapper; songwriter; actor; dancer
- Years active: 2018–present
- Awards: Full list
- Musical career
- Origin: Lagos, Nigeria
- Genres: Afrobeats; hip-hop; fuji; street pop; Afro fusion; Afropop; Nigerian pop
- Instruments: Vocals; piano
- Labels: gamma.; YBNL; Empire

Ahmed Ololade (born 13 January 1995), known professionally as Asake, is a Nigerian singer, rapper, and songwriter. Asake initially rose to fame in 2022 with the song "Omo Ope" with Olamide. In February 2022, he released his debut EP, Ololade Asake under Olamide’s YBNL Nation.

This was followed by his debut album, Mr. Money with the Vibe (2022), which debuted at number one on the TurnTable Top 100 chart and number 66 on the Billboard 200 chart. He continued this success with his second album, Work of Art (2023). Asake's third album, Lungu Boy (2024), became his third consecutive number one album in Nigeria and the longest-running number one on the Nigerian chart history at the time.

Asake released the collaborative EP Real, Vol. 1 with Wizkid in 2026, and all four of its tracks debuted in the top five on the Turntable Top 100 Songs chart. Asake's fourth album, M$ney released in May 2026, which surpassed Lungu Boy as the longest running number-one in Nigeria. In July 2026, Asake released the live album M$ney (Live in London) in collaboration with Spotify.

He has been nominated for over thirty-five accolades and holds the record for the most number-one songs in Nigeria, with 14. and was the country's most streamed artist from 2022 to 2025.

== Career ==
=== 2017–2022: Beginnings ===
Asake studied Theatre and Dramatic Arts at Obafemi Awolowo University. His career took off in 2022 prior to releasing the single "Mr. Money", followed by a remix with Zlatan and Peruzzi. Asake was signed to the now-defunct TFT Records in 2018. During this early career phase, he released several singles, including "Kanipe" on February 26, 2019, under the label. This period was part of his initial efforts to break into the Nigerian music scene before his later massive success with YBNL. In February 2022, fellow Nigerian artist Olamide signed Asake to his YBNL Records imprint. That same month, he released his debut extended play, Ololade, which featured his breakthrough song "Omo Ope", featuring Olamide, and the single "Sungba" which was plugged by Olaitan Salaudeen. In July 2022, Asake signed a distribution deal with Empire.

=== 2022–2023: Mr. Money with the Vibe and Work of Art ===
Asake released his debut studio album, Mr. Money with the Vibe, on 8 September 2022. It was supported by the singles "Terminator", "Peace Be Unto You", and a remix of "Sungba" with Burna Boy. The album was well received by fans in his home country of Nigeria, as well as across the world, and broke several records globally. The album debuted at number 66 on the Billboard 200.

In September 2022, Asake announced the Mr. Money with the Vibe United Kingdom tour, selling out 3 dates at the O2 Academy Brixton in London. On the final date of the Brixton Academy shows, several people were critically injured during a crowd crush. Two people – 33-year-old concertgoer Rebecca Ikumelo and 23-year-old security guard Gaby Hutchinson – later died of their injuries.

In December 2022, Asake was crowned "artiste of the year" by streaming service Audiomack after his debut studio album Mr. Money with the Vibes amassed over 330 million streams, and was subsequently announced alongside Kizz Daniel, Snazzy the Optimist and 1ucid as one of the most streamed and top trending artists in February 2023 by the platform, after releasing the single "Yoga" in January 2023 which ventured into sega music. This was followed by the track "2:30" in April, and "Amapiano" with Olamide in May.

His second studio album Work of Art was announced shortly after the release of "Amapiano". In April 2023, Asake appeared on Good Morning America to discuss his music. Asake released his second studio album, Work of Art, on 16 June 2023. The album debuted at number 66 on the Billboard 200 with 13,000 units sold during its debut week. The album also reached number 20 on the UK Albums Chart and number 59 on the Irish Albums Chart. The album was reported by Nigeria's TurnTable charts as the most streamed Nigerian album of 2023 so far. Work of Art became Asake's second album to receive a BRIT silver plaque after his debut album Mr Money With The Vibes which also got a silver certification in the UK.

=== 2024–present: Lungu Boy, Real, Vol. 1 and M$ney ===
In June 2024, Asake announced a global tour titled, Lungu Boy World Tour in conjunction with the release of his third album Lungu Boy, which released in August. Lungu Boy logged 5 tracks in the top 10 of the TurnTable Top 100 upon release. The album also set a new record for the biggest opening day global streams for a Nigerian album on Spotify with 9.2 million streams. The album features Central Cee, Stormzy, Wizkid, Travis Scott, and Ludmilla.

The second track, "MMS" (with Wizkid), broke the record for the most first-day streams on a song in Spotify Nigeria at the time. His song "Skating" was featured in the 2024 Spotify Africa "Skate Noise Lagos" campaign.

Asake's remarkable ascent in the music industry continued, but rumors of his departure from YBNL surfaced online after he unfollowed the label and removed all traces of it from his Instagram. On 12 February 2025, he released the single "Why Love" under his newly established independent label, Giran Republic, officially marking his departure from YBNL Nation. This move had been the subject of speculation, which Asake confirmed with the launch of his label. On 24 July, Asake released the single "Badman Gangsta" with French rapper Tiakola.

On 5 December 2025, during an Apple Music Radio takeover, Asake and Wizkid announced a collaborative EP titled Real, Vol. 1. Initially slated for release that month, it instead came out on 22 January 2026. It debuted at number one on the TurnTable Albums chart.

On 19 March 2026, Asake released the single "Worship" with DJ Snake. On 22 April, Asake announced his fourth studio album, M$NEY, which released on 1 May. It became Nigeria's biggest album debut, reaching 57 million streams in its first week and debuted at number-one on the TurnTable albums chart with 38,020 sales.

In July 2026, Asake released the concert film and accompanying live audio album M$NEY Live in London (Spotify Live) exclusively on Spotify, becoming the first artist globally to launch a full live concert film on the platform. Filmed during a one-night-only black-tie event at London's historic Theatre Royal, Drury Lane, Asake performed songs from his fourth studio album, M$NEY, alongside unreleased material, accompanied by a live orchestra, a 40-member choir, and live band The Compozers. The performance marked the first time an Afrobeats artist had headlined the venue.

== Notable performances ==
In September 2023, Asake became the first African artist to headline and sell out a concert at the New York City, Barclays Center. In August 2023, he achieved a significant milestone by selling out the O2 Arena in London. He made a memorable entrance by arriving in a helicopter. On February 1, 2024, Asake appeared on The Late Show With Stephen Colbert, performing during the episode that aired on that date, reaching a broader American audience.

== Artistry ==
Asake's distinctive musical style exhibits Afrobeats, dynamic rap street pop (also street hop), fújì music (and other fújì-centered musical styles), Afro fusion and Nigerian pop. His music is often an amalgamation of traditional Yoruba music and percussion spanning heterogeneous contemporary music. Asake's vocal style delivery, primarily in Yoruba merged with English, urban colloquial slang and Nigerian Pidgin, reflects Nigerian hip hop and fújì music influences.

== Discography ==
=== Studio albums ===
- Mr. Money with the Vibe (2022)
- Work of Art (2023)
- Lungu Boy (2024)
- M$NEY (2026)

=== Extended plays ===
- Ololade (2022)
- Real, Vol. 1 with Wizkid (2026)

== Awards and nominations ==
Asake awards and nominations
Awards and nominations
| Award | Wins | Nominations |
| American Music Awards | 0 | 1 |
| BET | 0 | 3 |
| Billboard | 0 | 2 |
| Grammy | 0 | 2 |
| MOBO | 1 | 2 |
| MTV Europe | 0 | 4 |
| MTV VMA | 0 | 3 |
| NAACP | 0 | 1 |

Awards and nominations received by Asake
| Award | Year (Note: Indicates the year of ceremony. Each year is linked to the article about the awards held that year, wherever possible.) | Category | Recipient(s) or nominee(s) | Result | Ref. |
|---|---|---|---|---|---|
| 3Music Ghana Awards | 2024 | African Song of the Year | "Amapiano" | Nominated | |
| American Music Awards | 2025 | Favourite Afrobeats Artist | "Himself" | Nominated | |
| TurnTable Music Awards | 2024 | Himself | No. 1 Artiste | Won | |
| TurnTable Music Awards | 2024 | Lungu Boy | No. 1 Album | Won | |
| Image Award | 2024 | "Amapiano" (with Olamide) | Outstanding International Song | Nominated | |
| BET Awards | 2024 | Himself | International Act | Nominated | |
| BET Awards | 2025 | Himself | Best New International Act | Nominated | |
| Billboard Music Awards | 2024 | Himself | Top Afrobeats Artist | Nominated | |
| Brit Awards | 2024 | Himself | International Artist | Nominated | |
| MOBO Awards | 2023 | Himself | Best African Act | Won | |
| Ghana Music Awards | 2023 | Himself | Best African Artist of the Year | Won | |
| Grammy Awards | 2024 | "Amapiano" (with Olamide) | Best African Music Performance | Nominated | |
| Grammy Awards | 2025 | "MMS" (with Wizkid) | Best African Music Performance | Nominated | |
| MTV Europe Music Awards | 2023 | Himself | Best Afrobeats | Nominated | |
| MTV Europe Music Awards | 2023 | Himself | Best African Act | Nominated | |
| MTV Europe Music Awards | 2024 | Himself | Best African Act | Nominated | |
| MTV Europe Music Awards | 2024 | Himself | Best Afrobeats | Nominated | |
| MTV Video Music Awards | 2024 | ""Bandana" (with Fireboy DML) | Best Afrobeats Video | Nominated | |
| MTV Video Music Awards | 2025 | ""Active" (with Travis Scott) | Best Afrobeats Video | Nominated | |
| MTV Video Music Awards | 2025 | "Get It Right" (with Tems) | Best Afrobeats Video | Nominated | |
| Soundcity MVP Awards | 2024 | Himself | Male MVP | Won | |
| The Headies | 2022 | Mr. Money With The Vibe | Album of the Year | Won | |
| The Headies | 2022 | Himself | Best Male Artist | Nominated | |
| The Headies | 2022 | "Sungba" (Remix) (featuring Burna Boy) | Song of the Year | Nominated | |
| The Headies | 2022 | Himself | Next Rated | Won | |
| The Headies | 2022 | Asake for "Joha" | Best Street-Hop Artiste | Nominated | |
| The Headies | 2023 | "Terminator" | Best Collaboration | Nominated | |
| The Headies | 2023 | "Sungba" (Remix) (featuring Burna Boy) | Headies Viewer's Choice | Nominated | |
| The Headies | 2023 | "Active" (with Travis Scott) | African Music Performance | Nominated | |
| The Headies | 2023 | Himself | Best African Act | Nominated | |
| The Headies | 2023 | Himself | Digital Artist | Nominated | |
| The Headies | 2025 | "Remember" | Afrobeat Song of the Year | Nominated | |
| The Headies | 2025 | Himself | Digital Artist of the Year | Nominated | |
| The Headies | 2025 | Work of Art | Album of the Year | Nominated | |
| The Headies | 2025 | Himself | Artist of the Year | Nominated | |
| Les Flammes | 2026 | "Badman Gangsta" ft. Tiakola | Flame for European and/or International Collaboration of the Year | Won | |
