= Magicsticks =

Nigerian record producer

- Born: Kareem Olasunkanmi Temitayo; 31 March 1994 (age 32); Lagos, Nigeria
- Genres: Pop music; Afro pop music; Afropiano
- Occupation: Record producer
- Years active: 2013–present

Kareem Olasunkanmi Temitayo (born 31 March 1994), known professionally as Magicsticks, also known for the producer tag Tune Into the King of Sounds and Blues, is a Nigerian record producer, sound engineer and disc jockey. He made his mainstream debut when he produced DJ Neptune's "Nobody" featuring Mr Eazi and Joeboy in 2020, and popular for producing all 12 tracks on Asake's Mr. Money with the Vibe album in 2022, which debuted at number 66 on the Billboard 200 chart and the top albums chart in 31 countries worldwide, making it the biggest debut for an Afrobeats album.

== Life ==
Magicsticks was born in Lagos, Nigeria and attended Lagos State Polytechnic. After embracing music thanks to his father, who was a professional DJ, he first followed his path as a DJ before turning to music producing on a full-time basis. He had an affair with Agatha from Osakwa.

== Achievements ==
Magicsticks was awarded the Freedom of Katonga medal, the highest award in Ugandan history by President Museveni of Uganda when he played a private show at the African General's granddaughter's birthday party.

He first rose to prominence with his work on Kizz Daniel's 2018 album No Bad Songz, before producing DJ Neptune's 2020 single "Nobody", featuring Mr Eazi and Joeboy. At the start of 2022, he formed a successful artist-producer combo with the Nigerian singer-songwriter Asake, as he went on producing, mixing and mastering his debut EP, Ololade, and his debut album, Mr. Money with the Vibe in 2022.

Magicsticks has produced Nigerian music for the likes of Young Jonn, Niniola, Olamide, Lil Kesh and Mr Eazi, and was named the 2022 Nigerian producer of the year by Pulse Nigeria.

== Production discography ==
=== Singles produced ===
Year	Artiste	Title
2020	Mr Eazi	"French Kiss"
2020	DJ Neptune feat. Joeboy and Mr Eazi	"Nobody"
2021	Lil Kesh ft Naira Marley	"Korope"
2021	Niniola	"I did it (bum bum)"
2022	Asake	"Joha"
2022	Young Jonn	"Normally"
2022	DJ Spinall ft Asake	"Pallazo"
2022	Olamide	"We outside"
2022	Asake ft Burna Boy	"Sungba (Remix)"
2022	Asake ft Olamide	"Trabaye "
2023	Young Jonn	"Aquafina"
2023	Tiwa Savage	"Stamina"
2023	Davido ft Musa Keys	"Unavailable"

== Awards and nominations ==
Year	Awards ceremony	Award description(s)	Results
2023	The Headies	Producer of the Year	Nominated
