= Piece of My Heart (Wizkid song) =

Single by Wizkid featuring Brent Faiyaz

from the album Morayo
- Released: 18 October 2024
- Genre: Afropop; R&B
- Length: 4:19
- Label: RCA
- Songwriters: Ayodeji Balogun; Brent Faiyaz; Andrew Dineen; Ari PenSmith; Dpat; P2J; Tay Iwar; Jules Cortez; Clout King Cory; Alan Bergman; Marilyn Bergman; Marvin Hamlisch; RZA; GZA; Ol’ Dirty Bastard; Method Man; Raekwon; Ghostface Killah; U-God; Inspectah Deck
- Producers: P2J; Dpat; Juice Cuice; Drew80HD

Wizkid singles chronology
"Work Me Out" (2024)	"Piece of My Heart" (2024)	"Kese (Dance)" (2024)

Brent Faiyaz singles chronology
"WY@" (2023)	"Piece of My Heart" (2024)

Music video
- "Piece of My Heart" on YouTube

"Piece of My Heart" is a song by Nigerian singer and songwriter Wizkid featuring vocals from American singer Brent Faiyaz. It was released on 18 October 2024 by RCA as the lead single from Wizkid's sixth studio album, Morayo. The song samples Wu-Tang Clan's 1994 single "Can It Be All So Simple". The song received critical acclaim and won the award for Outstanding Duo, Group, or Collaboration (Contemporary) at the 56th NAACP Image Awards.

== Background ==
In September 2024, Wizkid released a snippet of the song via Instagram and revealed it as the lead single from his sixth album, Morayo. Shortly after, a listening party was held in London to promote the single and the official release date was announced.

== Accolades ==
Year	Awards ceremony	Award description(s)	Results
2025	NAACP Image Awards	Outstanding Duo, Group or Collaboration (Contemporary)	Won
2025	MTV Video Music Awards	Best Afrobeats Video	Nominated

== Charts ==
Chart performance for "Piece of My Heart"
Chart (2024)	Peak position
New Zealand Hot Singles (RMNZ)	13
Nigeria (TurnTable Top 100)	1
Suriname (Nationale Top 40)	8
UK Singles (Official Charts)	61
UK Afrobeats (Official Charts)	1
UK Hip Hop/R&B (Official Charts)	20
US Afrobeats Songs (Billboard)	4
US Mainstream R&B/Hip-Hop Airplay (Billboard)	31
US Hot R&B Songs (Billboard)	10
US R&B/Hip-Hop Airplay (Billboard)	35
US World Digital Song Sales (Billboard)	7
