= Bad to Me (Wizkid song) =

Single by Wizkid

from the album More Love, Less Ego
- Released: 14 September 2022
- Genre: Afrobeats; amapiano
- Length: 2:56
- Label: Starboy; RCA
- Songwriters: Ayodeji Balogun; Richard Isong; Samuel Awuku
- Producers: P2J; Sammy Soso (co.)

Wizkid singles chronology
"Majo" (2022)	"Bad to Me" (2022)	"Abracadabra (Remix)" (2023)

Music video
- "Bad to Me" on YouTube

"Bad to Me" is a song by Nigerian singer Wizkid. It was released on 14 September 2022 as the lead single from his fifth studio album, More Love, Less Ego (2022). The song was written by Wizkid, P2J, and Sammy Soso; the latter two also produce the song. It blends Afrobeats with amapiano influences. Serving as Wizkid's first release since the deluxe edition of Made in Lagos (2021), the song's lyrics focus on love, desire, and attraction, while the production features log drums, layered percussion, and melodic keys associated with amapiano.

A music video for "Bad to Me" premiered on 19 October 2022 and was directed by Child. Shot in the United Kingdom, it shows Wizkid performing on a television variety show with a narrative centered on a behind-the-scenes relationship. The video drew strong early viewership and ranked among Nigeria's trending music videos at the time of release. The song received mixed to positive responses from critics, who commented on its groove and stylistic choices. It sparked online discussion about amapiano's place in Nigerian music, earned a nomination at the 54th NAACP Image Awards, and was certified platinum in Nigeria.

== Background ==
In June 2022, Wizkid teased an upcoming single on Instagram by sharing a studio snippet with the caption "New sound days away". On 9 September 2022, he officially announced that his next single, "Bad to Me", would be released on 14 September 2022, sharing the cover art and a presave link. The single was his first release following the deluxe edition of Made in Lagos (2021), which added four new tracks to the original album.

== Composition ==
"Bad to Me" is an amapiano song with elements of Afrobeats, produced by P2J and Sammy Soso. It has a runtime of two minutes and fifty-seven seconds. The song's production features log drums, shakers, deep percussion, and bright keys associated with amapiano, while maintaining Wizkid's melodic Afrobeats vocal style. It opens with a sparse four-count before introducing layered percussion and keys. The song departs slightly from typical amapiano arrangements by starting at a faster pace and slowing during the chorus rather than building toward a more energetic hook.

== Music video ==
The official music video for "Bad to Me" premiered on 19 October 2022. The video was directed by Child and produced by MrMr Films. Shot in the United Kingdom, the video depicts Wizkid performing on a television variety show, where he appeared both as the musical guest and as part of the show's narrative. It followed a storyline in which the show's producer was portrayed as Wizkid's secret lover. According to NotJustOk, the music video recorded over 665,000 views and more than 60,000 likes on YouTube within its first 24 hours. The video also ranked among the top five trending music videos in Nigeria at the time of its release. A preview of Wizkid's then-upcoming promotional single "Money & Love" occurred at the end of the video.

In a review for Afrocritik, Emmanuel Daraloye wrote that the retro-styled video presented Wizkid as "charmed and fascinated by a woman's body," using a television show setting to explore desire, fame, and control through staged performances and behind-the-scenes moments. He concluded that the visual told "a simple story encoded in sublime messages" and served as "a concise tribute to the past with a fantastic presentation of the present," rating it 7/10.

== Reception ==
=== Fan and cultural response ===
Upon release, "Bad to Me" prompted discussion about the use of amapiano in Nigerian music and its South African origins. Fans debated the song's originality, with some noting that other earlier collaborations, such as Wizkid and Burna Boy in Kabza de Small's "Sponono", introduced them to the genre. Reactions included claims that "Davido brought amapiano from South Africa two years ago and made it a successful genre in Africa and Beyond, Wizkid is now hopping on the same genre after Davido made it a successful genre." Others highlighted that artists like KDDO, May D, and Cassper Nyovest were part of earlier West African adoption of amapiano.

=== Critical feedback ===
Jordan Darville of The Fader described the song as "a sultry jam where Wizkid is both under a spell and the one doing the casting." Adegboyega Adeleye of Vanguard wrote that "P2J, Sammy Soso, and Wizkid restyled amapiano to Afropiano in a love-themed manner for groove rather than the usual upbeat tune," criticized the chorus as slow since "an amapiano chorus is expected to be upbeat and more groovy than the 'E ye ge ge' style used here," but concluded that the song "will surely grow on you as its groovy vibe suits a party mode and a club anthem," noting that Wizkid had "reformed amapiano to suit his regular Afrobeats style." Sughnen Yongo, a writer for OkayAfrica, saw the single as "a combustible culmination of elevated seductive energy with heavy underscores of amapiano."

Rolling Stone writer Will Dukes, in a review for More Love, Less Ego, noted that "Bad to Me" is "driven by a pulsing thump and lucid keys...built for a late-night slow grind." He noted that Wizkid delivered the song with a sensual tone and quoted the line "This kind love, yeah / Wey dey make me want more" to illustrate its focus on desire. Dukes added that the track’s groove and melodic structure made it feel immersive and club-oriented, even when heard in everyday settings. Kyann-Sian Williams of NME, also reviewing More Love, Less Ego, said the song "utilises amapiano-style soft-rolling 808 beats and chant-like vocals." A writer for Ratings Game Music, Quincy, commended Wizkid's lyrics for being "effortlessly romantic". He concluded the review by declaring it "another hit in Wizkid's catalog."

=== Accolades ===
Year	Awards ceremony	Award description(s)	Results
2023	NAACP Image Awards	Outstanding International Song	Nominated

== Charts ==
Chart performance for "Bad to Me"
Chart (2022)	Peak position
Nigeria (TurnTable Top 100)	3
UK Afrobeats (Official Charts)	3
UK Singles (Official Charts)	98
US Afrobeats Songs (Billboard)	8
US World Digital Song Sales (Billboard)	2

== Certifications ==
Certifications for "Bad to Me"
Region	Certification	Certified units/sales
Nigeria (TCSN)	Platinum	100,000^{‡}
^{‡} Sales+streaming figures based on certification alone.

== Personnel ==
Credits adapted from Apple Music.

- Ayodeji "Wizkid" Balogun - vocals, songwriting
- Richard "P2J" Isong - production, songwriting
- Samuel "Sammy Soso" Awuku - production, songwriting
- Sam Harper - engineering
- Leandro "Dro" Hidalgo - mixing, mastering

== Release history ==
Release history and formats for "Bad to Me"
Region	Date	Format	Label
Various	14 September 2022	Streaming; digital download	Starboy; RCA
