= Kese (Dance) =

Single by Wizkid

from the album Morayo
- Released: 15 November 2024
- Genre: Afrobeats
- Length: 2:54
- Label: RCA
- Songwriters: Richard Isong; Ayodeji Ibrahim Balogun
- Producer: P2J

Wizkid singles chronology
| "Piece of My Heart" (2024) | "Kese (Dance)" (2024) | "Gimme Dat" (2024) |

Music video
- "Kese (Dance)" on YouTube

"Kese (Dance)" is a song by Nigerian singer and songwriter Wizkid. It was released on 15 November 2024 by RCA Records as the second single from Wizkid's sixth studio album, Morayo.

== Achievements ==
"Kese (Dance)" became the fastest solo African song to hit 10 million Spotify streams (9 days) and racked up 1.5 million streams in just 24 hours.

== Personnel ==
Credits adapted from Apple Music.

- Wizkid — vocals, songwriting
- Richard "P2J" Isong — songwriting, production
- Marco Bernardis — saxophone
- Gaetan Judd — guitar
- Moses Olukayode — drums
- Sam Harper — mixing, recording
- Dale Becker — mastering
- Adam Burt — assistant mastering
- Noah McCorkle — assistant mastering
- Brandon Hernandez — assistant mastering

== Charts ==
Chart performance for "Kese (Dance)"
| Chart (2024) | Peak position |
|---|---|
| Nigeria (TurnTable Top 100) | 1 |
| UK Singles (OCC) | 78 |
| UK Afrobeats (OCC) | 1 |
| UK Hip Hop/R&B (OCC) | 34 |
| US Afrobeats Songs (Billboard) | 5 |
