= When It Blooms =

Studio album by Nonso Amadi
- Released: 26 May 2023
- Recorded: 2022–2023
- Studio: Universal Music Studio Canada
- Genre: Afro R&B; Soul; Alté; Afropop
- Length: 49:26
- Label: Universal Music Canada; Def Jam; Polydor Records; MCA Records France; Universal Music Nigeria
- Producer: Nonso Amadi (exec.); London; Harper Gordon; CAPTAIN; TSB; FrancisGotHeat; Azul; P.Priime; Goldchain; Dëra; Mont Jake; Jordan Ullman; TJ Whitelaw

Nonso Amadi chronology
Free (2019)	When It Blooms (2023)

Singles from When It Blooms
- 1. "Foreigner" Released: 24 February 2022; 2. "Different" Released: 26 May 2022; 3. "Eye to Eye" Released: 1 September 2022; 4. "Ease Up" Released: 20 January 2023; 5. "Kilimanjaro" Released: 20 March 2023; 6. "Lock Up" Released: 24 March 2023

When It Blooms is the first studio album by Nigerian singer Nonso Amadi. It was released on 26 May 2023 by Universal Music Canada, Def Jam, Universal Music Nigeria, Polydor, and MCA Records France. It was exclusively produced by Nonso Amadi, with additional production from London, Harper Gordon, CAPTAIN, FrancisGotHeat, Azul, P.Priime, Goldchain, Dëra, TSB, Mont Jake, Jordan Ullman, and TJ Whitelaw. It features guest appearances from Beam, Zinoleesky, Tay Iwar, Tamera, and Majid Jordan.

== Background ==
On 26 May 2023, he spoke with Daddaboy Ehiz on the inspiration behind When It Blooms on Apple Music's Africa Now radio show, Nonso said: “Our lives are literally like plants. We start from the seed when we’re born, or whenever we get into something like music it’s like a seed stage. When you get to where you want to go, not everyone completely outgrows life, we’re all continually growing and that’s the process of a flower as well. It gets to a point where it comes out the soil – it’s beautiful to look at, you know it has all these petals and stuff – so it’s blooming, and I’m like that’s a beautiful way to put a project because my story is like that. I came out from school shy, not sure what I’m doing, insecure… and that’s like a seed, but right now I’m just so thankful, I’m open, I’m learning and it’s like the flower is fully opening up. I just thought ‘When It Blooms’ is a dramatic title to put it together.”

== Singles and other releases ==
"Foreigner" was released as the album's lead single on 24 February 2022. The accompanying music video for "Foreigner" was directed by Jordan Lee and shot in Toronto. The Majid Jordan-assisted track "Different" was released as the album's second single on 26 May 2022. The accompanying music video for "Different" was shot and directed by UAX. "Eye to Eye" was released as the third single on 1 September 2022. It was jointly produced by Nonso Amadi and Goldchain, accompanied by a visual video.

"Ease Up" was released as the fourth single on 20 January 2023, jointly produced by Nonso Amadi, Gordon Harper, and TJ Whitelaw. "Kilimanjaro" was released as the fifth single on 20 March 2023. The accompanying music video was directed by 300k. During the debut week of 29 May 2023, "Kilimanjaro" earned Nonso his first chart entry at number 70 on the Nigeria Top 100. On 24 March 2023, he released "Lock Up" featuring Zinoleesky. The accompanying music video was shot and directed by Joe Penny.

== Critical reception ==
Professional ratings
Review scores
Source	Rating
Pulse Nigeria	9/10

When It Blooms received generally positive reviews from music critics. In a review for Pulse Nigeria, Adeayo Adebiyi said: “'When It Blooms' takes fans who have been part of Nonso’s journey on a familiar trip that offers in large pieces the talent they know he possesses and which they have keenly waited for the rest of the world to see. For new listeners, the album takes them on a first-time excursion to discover new beauties while trusting Nonso as the reliable guide.”

In a review for The Native, Emmanuel Esomnofu said “‘When It Blooms’ is set to crown the expansive first arc of Nonso Amadi's career. Unlike the corporate certainty that has followed some of his contemporaries, Amadi lives the life of a true creative. They are seldom certain of what they want to do, but are strongly moved by what they don't want to do. For an artist with the unwavering standard and rich catalogue of Nonso Amadi, it is enviable that he would seek to push deeper into the textures of his artistry.”

=== Rankings ===
Select rankings of When It Blooms
Publication	List	Rank	Ref.
Pulse Nigeria	Pulse Nigeria 's 2023 Mid-Year Review: Top 10 Afrobeats albums (EP & LP)	2	

== Commercial performance ==
When It Blooms debuted at number 27 in Nigeria Top 50 Albums chart on 29 May 2023.

== Track listing ==
Credits adapted from Genius, & Boomplay

No.	Title	Writer(s)	Producer(s)	Length
1.	"Here For It"	Chinonso; Majid Al Maskati; Babatunde Brown	Nonso Amadi; Harper Gordon; CAPTAIN	3:34
2.	"NASA"	Chinonso	Nonso Amadi; FrancisGotHeat; Azul Wynter	3:59
3.	"Lock Up" (feat. Zinoleesky)	Chinonso; Oniyide Azeez	Nonso Amadi; P.Priime	3:43
4.	"Kilimanjaro" (feat. BEAM)	Chinonso; Tyshane Thompson; Odera Ezeani Godfrey	Dëra	3:12
5.	"Eye to Eye"	Chinonso; Evan Porter; John Vassos; Mahjabeen Baig; Goldchain	Nonso Amadi; Goldchain	2:36
6.	"Foreigner"	Chinonso; Ifedapo Balogun	Nonso Amadi	3:54
7.	"How Love Works (Interlude)"	Chinonso	Nonso Amadi	1:00
8.	"Pieces" (feat. Tay Iwar)	Chinonso; Austin Iornongu Iwar	Nonso Amadi	3:24
9.	"Night In Maryland"	Chinonso	TSB	3:54
10.	"Shivers" (feat. Tamera)	Chinonso; Tamera Foster	Mont Jake	3:58
11.	"Paper"	Chinonso	LONDON	3:08
12.	"Different" (feat. Majid Jordan)	Chinonso; Majid Jordan	Nonso Amadi; Jordan Ullman	2:26
13.	"Ease Up"	Chinonso; Harper Gordon; TJ Whitelaw	Nonso Amadi; Harper Gordon; TJ Whitelaw	3:35
14.	"Cali Was The Mission"	Chinonso	Mont Jake	2:44
15.	"Thankful"	Chinonso	Nonso Amadi	4:19
Total length:				49:26

== Charts ==
Chart performance for When It Blooms
Chart (2023)	Peak position
Nigeria Albums (TurnTable)	27

== Release history ==
Release history and formats for When It Blooms
Region	Date	Format	Label	Ref
Various	26 May 2023	Digital download; streaming	Universal Music Canada	
