= Tamera Foster =

English Afrobeat singer (born 1997)

- Born: Tamera Cuthbert; 27 January 1997 (age 29); Gravesend, Kent, England
- Genres: Pop; R&B; Afrobeat
- Occupation: Singer
- Years active: 2013–present
- Labels: Syco; Sony (former); Moonshyne Music; AWAL (current)

Tamera Cuthbert, professionally known as Tamera Foster is an English singer who competed in the tenth series of The X Factor in 2013. She was the eighth contestant eliminated and was subsequently signed to a Syco Music record deal.

== Early life ==
Tamera grew up listening to many genres of music, but was most inspired by Whitney Houston, Missy Elliott, Erykah Badu, Sammy Davis Jr., James Brown, and Beyonce. She also enjoyed drawing and painting, which became more serious hobbies in her early teens. After being encouraged by her mother and grandmother, Tamera performed at church, as well as several local talent shows. She decided to audition for The X Factor one week before the show, at the age of 16. She has claimed to have synesthesia.

=== 2013: The X Factor ===
She competed in the tenth series of The X Factor in 2013. In week four, Foster was in the bottom two with Kingsland Road, but Foster was saved by a majority vote. However, voting statistics revealed that Kingsland Road received more votes than Foster, which meant that if the result went to deadlock, Kingsland Road would have been saved. She was eventually eliminated in the quarter-final. Former Judge Simon Cowell subsequently signed her to his label Syco Music after dubbing her "the British Rihanna".

=== 2014–2022: Syco Music and Afrodite ===
After her stint on The X Factor, Tamera was signed to a deal with Syco Music in March 2014, at the age of 17.

Tamera was sent to writing camps in LA, New York, and Sweden, and worked with producer Kamille in early pop-influenced album writing sessions. In a now-deleted December 2014 YouTube vlog upload of a behind-the-scenes studio session, a song titled "Hit You Like A Bullet" was teased alongside a jazz cover of "Santa Claus Is Comin' to Town". Failing to agree with the label on a musical direction, the music from Syco never materialized, with Tamera instead waiting for the 3 year contract to expire. She parted ways with the label in 2016. Tamera was credited as a co-writer on 2017 Bakermat single "Don't Want You Back". In 2019, Tamera signed an undisclosed record deal with London-based label Moonshyne Music Ltd. and music distributor AWAL, subsequently releasing her debut single "Romeo" produced by Parker Ighile. She later released second single "Don't Phone", as well as third single "Flipside" produced by Future Cut and Oscar Scheller. Billboard described the sound of her fourth single "Wickedest" as "the embodiment of smoothness". Tamera released her debut EP Afrodite, executive-produced by P2J, in 2021. The Clash reviewed it positively, describing it as a "warm embrace of feminine energy... spotlight[ing] the singer's African and Greek heritage amongst silky riffs and intimate songwriting." In November 2022, she released the single "Insensitive", which received "track of the day" honors on Clash and was heralded as a "superb return".

=== 2023–present: Lost In Translation ===
In February 2023, Tamera released "Frozen", an electro-dance single co-written by OVO Sound artist Majid Al Maskati. Her second EP Lost In Translation was released in November 2023, which contained "40 Days", her first charting single on the UK Afrobeats Singles Chart. In December 2023, Tamera was nominated for "Best Newcomer" at the 26th edition of the MOBO Awards.

== Discography ==
=== EPs ===
- Afrodite (2021)
- Lost in Translation (2023)

=== Singles ===
Title	Year	UK Afrobeats Singles Chart	Album
"Romeo"	2019	—	Non-album single
"Don't Phone"	2019	—	Non-album single
"Flipside"	2020	—	Rocks (Original Motion Picture Soundtrack)
"Wickedest"	2021	—	Afrodite
"Strong for Me"	2021	—	Afrodite
"Good Love" (Feat. Tay Iwar)	2021	—	Afrodite
"New Hobby"	2021	—	Afrodite
"Insensitive"	2022	—	Non-album single
"Frozen"	2023	—	Non-album single
"Diversion"	2023	—	Lost in Translation
"Poison"	2023	—	Lost in Translation
"40 Days" (feat. CKay)	2023	16	Lost in Translation
"Supernova"	2024	—	TBA
"Angel in Disguise" (Cover) (with No Guidnce & Rodney Jerkins)	2025	—	Spotify exclusive single
"Blessings"	2025	—	

=== Guest appearances ===
List of guest appearances, with other performing artists, showing year released and album name
Title	Year	Other performer(s)	Album
"Dynamite"	2017	Kojey Radical & Pote	In God's Body
"Identify"	2017	Parker Ighile	Non-album single
"Wanna Be with You"	2023	Steel Banglez & Mowgs	The Playlist
"Honest"	2023	Spinall, Tay Iwar & TSB	Top Boy
"I'm So High"	2023	p-rallel & Toddla T	Movement
"Options"	2023	Kamille & Bellah	K1
"Shivers"	2023	Nonso Amadi	When It Blooms
"Girlfriend (London Girls Mix)"	2024	Ayanna & Mnelia	In a Perfect World (Complete Set)
"Wrist on Freeze"	2024	Ms Banks & Stay Flee Get Lizzy	Stars Aligned
"Locked In"	2025	Aitch	4

=== Songwriting credits ===
Title	Year	Artist	Album
"Don't Want You Back" (Featuring Kiesza)	2017	Bakermat	Non-album single
"Family Ties" (Featuring Anariii)	2024	Carla Prata	Pupa

== Awards and nominations ==
Year	Ceremony	Award	Result	Ref
2024	26th MOBO Awards	Best Newcomer	Nominated	

== Tours ==
Supporting

- Jessie Reyez - Paid In Memories Tour (2025)
