= Made in Lagos =

Studio album by Wizkid
- Released: 30 October 2020
- Genres: Afrobeats; R&B
- Length: 52:05
- Languages: English; Yoruba; Nigerian Pidgin
- Labels: Starboy; RCA
- Producers: P2J; Kel-P; Blaqjerzee; London; Kill September; Sarz; Juls; Legendury Beatz; P.Priime; Akeel Henry; Dré Pinckney; Kevin Ekofo; Saint Mino; Sammy Soso

Wizkid chronology
Sounds from the Other Side (2017)	Made in Lagos (2020)	More Love, Less Ego (2022)

Singles from Made in Lagos
- 1. "Smile" Released: 16 July 2020; 2. "No Stress" Released: 17 September 2020; 3. "Ginger" Released: 8 January 2021; 4. "Essence" Released: 9 April 2021

Singles from Made in Lagos deluxe
- 1. "Mood" Released: 8 February 2022

Made in Lagos is the fourth studio album by Nigerian singer-songwriter Wizkid. It was released on 30 October 2020 by Starboy Entertainment and RCA Records.

The album features guest appearances from Burna Boy, Skepta, H.E.R., Ella Mai, Tay Iwar, Projexx, Tems, Damian Marley, Terri and was executive produced by P2J. The deluxe edition was released on 27 August 2021. It features additional guest appearances from Buju and Justin Bieber. In support of the album, Wizkid embarked on the Made in Lagos Tour (2021–2022). The album received a nomination at the 64th Annual Grammy Awards for Best Global Music Album.

== Background ==
Wizkid's last full length album was Sounds from the Other Side (2017). In 2019, he released his two singles, "Joro" and "Ghetto Love", and teased them as promotional singles for his upcoming studio album, Made in Lagos. He also appeared in "Brown Skin Girl" alongside Beyonce, Blue Ivy, and Saint Jhn. In 2020, he contributed to singles including, "Escape" by Akon, "Gbese 2.0" with DJ Tunez and Spax, "Eve Bounce" by Yung L, and "Consider II" with Del B, Flavour, Kex, and Walshy Fire.

On 6 December 2019, Wizkid's label Starboy Entertainment released the EP Soundman Vol. 1, centering mainly on Wizkid, and containing features from Chronixx, and a variety of other artists. It was cited as a marketing strategy to test the Afro-European market for Made in Lagos.

== Composition ==
Morgan Enos of The Recording Academy described Made In Lagos' musical composition as a "mix of Afrobeats and R&B". Stereogum described the album's aesthetic as "R&B-focused, dancehall-reminiscent" lending itself to WizKid's "casual Auto-Tuned melodies, and a range of guests similarly thrive within the environment", defining its beats as "meticulously complex". Pitchfork's writer Joey Akan commented that the album showcases a "mid-tempo production".

== Release and promotion ==
Made in Lagos was initially set to be released on October 15. The album launch was later postponed until 30 October due to the Nigerian End SARS protests nationwide.

Wizkid promoted Made in Lagos with his Made in Lagos Tour, which started on 10 September 2021, performing in New York City, Boston, Toronto, and Los Angeles.

=== Singles ===
Wizkid released a collaboration with American singer, H.E.R., titled "Smile", on 16 July 2020 as the album's lead single. The song made its debut at number three in the first week of launch of the UK Afrobeats Singles Chart, and was featured on Barack Obama's 2020 summer playlist. On 17 September, Wizkid released the single "No Stress".

"Essence" featuring Tems, was released as the album's fourth single on 9 April 2021. On 13 August 2021, a remix of the song, featuring Canadian singer Justin Bieber, was released. The song became the highest-charting single on the Billboard Hot 100 by an African act, peaking at number nine. "Essence" was also the first Nigerian song in history to chart on the Billboard Hot 100 and the Billboard Global 200.

== Critical reception ==
Professional ratings
Review scores
Source	Rating
Clash	7/10
The Guardian	4/5 stars
The Native	8.4/10
Naijaloaded	8/10
NME	3/5 stars
Pitchfork	7.7/10
Mp3Paw.ng	4/5 stars
Tubidy	8/10
Pulse Nigeria	7.2/10

Made in Lagos received widespread acclaim for its cohesive themes, lyrics and lush production, building on criticisms on Wizkid's previous works, Sounds from the Other Side and Soundman Vol. 1.

On Made in Lagos Wizkid fuses culture and globalisation, with the album containing themes of love, focus, goodwill, gratitude and grace. He implements the use of rich, local African percussions as the core of the production on Made in Lagos and explores a range of genres. Joey Akan of Pitchfork stated that "Wizkid balances the formula to unite home and abroad with big pop songs that can compete across cultures and an underlying theme that embraces his roots". Giving it a four star review, Kate Hutchinson of The Guardian found the album sounds slinkier and sexy, while naming it Wizkid's most sophisticated record yet. Made in Lagos often features in debates of the best African albums ever; the consensus being that it was at the forefront of a revolutionary charge in the globalization of African music.

=== Year-end rankings ===
Year-end rankings for Made in Lagos
Publication	Accolade	Rank	Ref.
The Guardian	The Best Albums of 2020	43	
Vice	The 100 Best Albums of 2020	74	
NME	The 50 Best Albums of 2020	34	
The Native	The 20 Best Albums of 2020	1	
Bounce Radio Live	The 50 Best African Albums of 2020	3	
Pan African Music	Best Albums of 2020	N/A	
The Blues Project	The 15 Best R&B, Soul and Jazz Albums of 2020	N/A	
Clash	The Best Albums of 2020	36	
The Fader	The 50 Best Albums of the Year 2020	33	
GQ (UK)	The 24 Best Albums of 2020	17	
The Atlantic	The 16 Best Albums of 2020	N/A	
Highsnobiety	Highsnobiety's 20 Best Albums of 2020	5	
Financial Times	The Best 10 Albums of 2020	N/A	
British Vogue	The Best 12 Albums of 2020	1	
Earmilk	The Best Albums of 2020 (Hip Hop + R&B)	N/A	
Reader's Digest	The Best Albums of 2020	N/A	
Pure Charts	Top 20 International albums of 2020	N/A	
MTV News	14 Albums you might've missed in 2020	N/A	

== Awards ==
At the 27th annual South African Music Awards, Made in Lagos received a nomination for the Rest of Africa Award. It also received a nomination at the 64th Annual Grammy Awards for Best Global Music Album. At the 7th annual African Entertainment Awards USA in 2021, Made in Lagos won Album Of The Year at the ceremony.

Made in Lagos Deluxe Edition received two nominations at 15th ceremony of The Headies, for Album of the Year, and Best Afrobeat Pop Album (Nigeria), a new category.

== Commercial performance ==
The album surpassed 100 million streams across five platforms nine days after release, a rare milestone then for Afro-pop artists.

It debuted at number 15 on the UK Albums Chart with over 4,100 album-equivalent units and number 80 on the US Billboard 200 with over 10,000 album-equivalent units. Following the release of the deluxe edition, the album sold an additional 17,000 units in the United States, peaking at number 28 on the US Billboard 200. It spent over 130 weeks on the Billboard World Albums chart making it the longest charting African project ever on the chart, and is the best selling African album of all time in the United States.

== Track listing ==
Made in Lagos track listing
No.	Title	Writer(s)	Producer(s)	Length
1.	"Reckless"	Ayodeji Balogun; Richard Isong; Emmanuel Isong; Ariowa Irosogie; Malik Venner	P2J	3:53
2.	"Ginger" (featuring Burna Boy)	Balogun; Damini Ogulu; Kelvin Udoma; R. Isong	Kel-P; P2J	3:16
3.	"Longtime" (featuring Skepta)	Balogun; Joseph Adenuga; Osabuohien Osaretin; R. Isong	Sarz; P2J	4:00
4.	"Mighty Wine"	Balogun; R. Isong	P2J	3:38
5.	"Blessed" (featuring Damian Marley)	Balogun; Marley; R. Isong	P2J	4:23
6.	"Smile" (featuring H.E.R)	Balogun; Gabriella Wilson; R. Isong; E. Isong	P2J	4:12
7.	"Piece of Me" (featuring Ella Mai)	Balogun; Ella Howell; Nija Charles; Kevin Okofo; Irosogie; R. Isong	P2J	3:17
8.	"No Stress"	Balogun; R. Isong	P2J	3:49
9.	"True Love" (featuring Tay Iwar and Projexx)	Balogun; Austin Iwar; Johni James; Julian Nicco-Annan; Ronald Osisanya; Kwado Asare	Juls	4:07
10.	"Sweet One"	Balogun; R. Isong; E. Isong; Marco Bernardis; Venner	P2J; Sammy Soso	4:11
11.	"Essence" (featuring Tems)	Balogun; Temilade Openiyi; Uzezi Oniko; Okiemute Oniko; R. Isong	Legendury Beatz; P2J	4:08
12.	"Roma" (featuring Terri)	Balogun; Terry Akewe; Okhuofu Isaiah	Blaqjerzee	3:00
13.	"Gyrate"	Balogun; Ekofo; Mino Drerup; Michael Hunter; Tomi Mannonen	Ekofo; Saint Mino; London; Kill September	3:14
14.	"Grace"	Balogun; R. Isong; Ekofo	P2J; Ekofo	3:23
Total length:				52:05

Deluxe edition
No.	Title	Writer(s)	Producer(s)	Length
15.	"Anoti"	Balogun; Peace Oredope; P.Priime; Akinbiyi Abiola Ahmed	P.Priime	3:01
16.	"Mood" (featuring Buju)	Balogun; Daniel Benson; R. Isong	P2J	3:30
17.	"Steady"	Balogun; R. Isong; Tay Iwar	P2J; Akeel Henry; Dré Pinckney	3:23
18.	"Essence" (featuring Justin Bieber and Tems)	Balogun; Bieber; Openiyi; U. Oniko; O. Oniko; R. Isong	Legendury Beatz; P2J	4:23
Total length:				66:22

== Charts ==
Chart performance for Made in Lagos
Chart (2020–2023)	Peak position
Belgian Albums (Ultratop Flanders)	69
Belgian Albums (Ultratop Wallonia)	86
Canadian Albums (Billboard)	45
Dutch Albums (Album Top 100)	33
Nigeria Top 50 Albums (TurnTable)	17
French Albums (SNEP)	60
Irish Albums (Official Charts)	42
Swiss Albums (Schweizer Hitparade)	73
UK Albums (Official Charts)	15
US Billboard 200	28
US World Albums (Billboard)	1

== Certifications ==
Certifications for Made in Lagos
Region	Certification	Certified units/sales
Canada (Music Canada)	Gold	40,000^{‡}
Netherlands (NVPI) Deluxe version	Gold	20,000^{‡}
New Zealand (RMNZ)	Gold	7,500^{‡}
Switzerland (IFPI Switzerland)	Gold	10,000^{‡}
United Kingdom (BPI)	Gold	100,000^{‡}
United States (RIAA)	Gold	500,000^{‡}
^{‡} Sales+streaming figures based on certification alone.
