= Soundman Vol. 1 =

SoundMan Vol. 1

EP by Starboy
- Released: 6 December 2019
- Recorded: 2019
- Genre: Afrobeats; reggae; R&B
- Length: 24:46
- Language: English; Yoruba; Nigerian Pidgin
- Label: Starboy
- Producer: P2J; Blaq Jerzee; Kel-P; London

Soundman Vol.1 is a debut EP by Nigerian singer Wizkid, credited as Starboy. It was released on 6 December 2019 through Starboy Entertainment without any announcement. The 7-track EP features additional vocals and production by Chronixx, Blaq Jerzee, Kel-P, London and DJ Tunez. Soundman Vol. 2, the sequel to the album, was released on 22 December 2023.

== Composition ==
Soundman Vol. 1 is an Afrobeats, reggae and R&B project that was recorded under exclusive license to Starboy Entertainment. Its production was handled by Blaq Jerzee, Kel P, P2J and London. The EP serves as a precursor to Wizkid's fourth studio album Made in Lagos.

== Critical reception ==
Professional ratings
Review scores
Source	Rating
Naijaloaded	8/10
SoundStroke	7.4/10
TooXclusive	5/10
Pulse Nigeria	4.3/10

Soundman Vol. 1 received mixed reviews from critics. Synord of Naijaloaded awarded the EP 8 stars out of 10, stating the project as "an album for listeners to enjoy with the family and loved ones". Reviewing for SoundStroke, an editor awarded 'SoundMan Vol. 1' 7.4 stars out of 10, commending WizKid; stating "the vocal delivery of the EP is top notch".

== Track listing ==
No.	Title	Writer(s)	Producer(s)	Length
1.	"Jam" (featuring Chronixx)	Ayodeji Balogun; Jamar McNaughton	P2J	3:19
2.	"Blow" (featuring Blaq Jerzee)	Balogun; Isaiah Okhuofu	Blaq Jerzee	3:48
3.	"Cover Me" (featuring DJ Tunez)	Balogun	Kel-P	3:19
4.	"Mine" (featuring Kel-P)	Balogun	Kel P	3:22
5.	"Electric" (featuring London)	Balogun	London	2:59
6.	"Ease Your Mind" (featuring Kel-P)	Balogun	Kel-P	3:05
7.	"Thankful"	Balogun	Blaq Jerzee	4:58
Total length:				24:46

Notes

- "Blow" is the only track that has a music video.
