= 4 (Aitch album) =

Studio album by Aitch
- Released: 20 June 2025
- Recorded: 2024–2025
- Genre: Hip-hop
- Length: 41:51
- Label: Infinitum
- Producer: LiTek; Mike Blackburn; Mojam; Pezmo; Sangy; T9C; WhYJay

Aitch chronology
| Lost Files (2023) | 4 (2025) |

Singles from 4
- 1. "Straight Rhymez 2" Released: 6 March 2025; 2. "Bounce" Released: 19 March 2025; 3. "Luv?" Released: 24 April 2025; 4. "Till L4te" Released: 22 May 2025; 5. "Col4 Body" Released: 19 June 2025

4 is the second studio album by British rapper Aitch, released on 20 June 2025. The album features guest appearances from Chimpo, Tigga Da Author, Pozer, AJ Tracey, Tamera, Anne-Marie, Kenzo Str8Drop and Avelino. The deluxe edition adds guest appearances from Nafe Smallz and Headie One. The album was released independently by Infinitum.

== Background ==
On 17 April 2025, Aitch announced his second studio album, 4, through a pop-up event in Manchester. The rapper appeared at four locations across the city aboard a fire truck playing new music from the album.

4 is a tribute to Aitch's roots, specifically referencing his Manchester postcode, M40, which inspired the album's title. He has stated that 4 is less personal than his debut album, Close to Home, and described it as more energetic, and representing the culture of Manchester.

== Singles ==
The lead single, "Straight Rhymez 2", a sequel to his breakout hit Straight Rhymez (2018), was released 6 March 2025. The song charted at number 45 on the UK Independent Singles Chart. The second single "Bounce" was released on 19 March 2025. The third single "LUV?", featuring Anne-Marie, was released on 24 April 2025. The single charted number 47 on the UK Independent Singles Chart. The fourth single "Till L4te", featuring Pozer, was released on 22 May 2025. The fifth and final single "Col4 Body", featuring Tiggs Da Author, was released on 19 June.

== Critical reception ==
Professional ratings
Review scores
| Source | Rating |
|---|---|
| Clash | 8/10 |

Andy Hill of Clash described the album as a bold departure from the softer tone of his debut album, calling it a "treasure trove of bangers". However, he noted that its provocative lyrics, such as: "head so good / never doubt your intelligence", may divide listeners between seeing it as playful or misogynistic.

== Track listing ==
4 track listing
| No. | Title | Writer(s) | Producer(s) | Length |
|---|---|---|---|---|
| 1. | "Clock The G4me" (featuring Chimpo) | Harrison Armstrong; Chimpo; WhYJay; LiTek | WhYJay; LiTek | 2:24 |
| 2. | "Bounce" | Armstrong; Mustafa Omer; James Murray | Mojam | 2:35 |
| 3. | "Col4 Body" (with Tiggs Da Author) | Armstrong; Adam Muhabwa; Omer; Murray; Ian Stoffer | Mojam; IanoBeatz | 2:25 |
| 4. | "Till L4te" (featuring Pozer) | Armstrong; Tyrone Paul; WhYJay; LiTek | WhYJay; LiTek | 2:08 |
| 5. | "Test" (featuring AJ Tracey) | Armstrong; Ché Grant; WhYJay; LiTek | WhYJay; LiTek | 2:38 |
| 6. | "M40" | Armstrong; WhYJay; LiTek; Sangy; Mike Blackburn | WhYJay; LiTek; Sangy; Mike Blackburn | 2:45 |
| 7. | "Loud!" | Armstrong; WhYJay; LiTek | WhYJay; LiTek | 2:05 |
| 8. | "Locked In" (featuring Tamera) | Armstrong; Tamera Cuthbert; Omer; Murray | Mojam | 3:18 |
| 9. | "SOS" | Armstrong; Omer; Murray; WhYJay; LiTek; Tamera; Max Moise; Rosie Williams | Mojam; WhYJay; LiTek | 2:47 |
| 10. | "Luv?" (featuring Anne-Marie) | Armstrong; Anne-Marie Nicholson; Omer; Murray | Mojam | 2:37 |
| 11. | "Pop It Off" (featuring Kenzo Str8Drop) | Armstrong; Marco McKenzie; WhYJay; LiTek; T9C | WhYJay; LiTek; T9C | 2:22 |
| 12. | "Ride Wimme" | Armstrong; WhYJay; LiTek | WhYJay; LiTek | 2:50 |
| 13. | "B4e Ple4se" | Armstrong; WhYJay; LiTek | WhYJay; LiTek | 2:25 |
| 14. | "Business" (featuring Avelino) | Armstrong; Achi Avelino; Omer; Murray; Nickolas Ashford; Jo Armstead; Valerie Simpson | Mojam | 2:39 |
| 15. | "Straight Rhymez 2" | Armstrong; Pezmo | Pezmo | 2:43 |
| 16. | "Room 44" | Armstrong; WhYJay; LiTek | WhYJay; LiTek | 3:02 |
| Total length: | | | | 41:51 |

Deluxe edition additional tracks
| No. | Title | Writer(s) | Producer(s) | Length |
|---|---|---|---|---|
| 17. | "4 The Soul" | Armstrong | | 2:18 |
| 18. | "Pick Up The P4ce" | Armstrong | | 1:26 |
| 19. | "My Slime" (featuring Nafe Smallz) | Armstrong; Nathan Adams | | 3:03 |
| 20. | "Gr4vey4rd Shift" (featuring Headie One) | Armstrong; Irving Adjei | M1OnTheBeat | 3:56 |
| Total length: | | | | 52:16 |

=== Notes ===
- All track titles are stylised in all caps.
- "M40" samples "Life's a Bitch" by Nas featuring AZ.

== Charts ==
Chart performance for 4
| Chart (2025) | Peak position |
|---|---|
| Scottish Albums (OCC) | 5 |
| UK Albums (OCC) | 7 |
| UK Independent Albums (OCC) | 1 |
| UK R&B Albums (OCC) | 2 |
