= More Love, Less Ego =

Studio album by Wizkid
- Released: 11 November 2022
- Genre: Pop; R&B; Afrobeats
- Length: 53:15
- Language: English; Yoruba; Nigerian Pidgin
- Label: RCA; Starboy
- Producer: Euro; Juls; KDaGreat; Kel-P; Kofo; P Priime; P2J; Sammy Soso

Wizkid chronology
Made in Lagos (2020)	More Love, Less Ego (2022)	S2 (2023)

Singles from More Love, Less Ego
- 1. "Bad to Me" Released: 14 September 2022

More Love, Less Ego is the fifth studio album by Nigerian singer Wizkid. It was released on 11 November 2022 through RCA Records and Starboy Entertainment. The album features guest appearances from Ayra Starr, Skillibeng, Shenseea, Skepta, Naira Marley, and Don Toliver. Production was handled by P2J, Kel-P, KDaGreat, Sammy Soso, P Priime, Juls, Kofo, and Euro. It serves as the follow-up to Wizkid's previous album, Made in Lagos (2020). The album was supported by two singles, "Bad to Me", and "Money & Love". More Love, Less Ego is a pop, R&B, and Afrobeats album that includes lyrics about falling in love with women and engaging in sexual activity. According to Wizkid, he named the album the way it is because "everyone fights with their ego and that's where I'm at", explaining that "I'm still trying to shed my ego, like everyone else".

== Release and promotion ==
On 30 October 2021, the one-year-anniversary of Wizkid's previous album, Made in Lagos (2020), he announced the title of his next album and stated that it would be released on the last day of his tour for it, which would be 22 January 2022. However, this did not happen. The lead single of More Love, Less Ego, "Bad to Me", was released on 14 September 2022. The sole promotional single, "Money & Love", was released on 28 October 2022, the same day Wizkid announced the release date of the album for the week after that. However, three days later, fellow Nigerian singer Davido's son died at age three from drowning in a swimming pool, in which Wizkid deleted a promotion tweet for it and pushed its release back by exactly one week to show his support.

== Critical reception ==
Professional ratings
Aggregate scores
Source	Rating
Metacritic	87/100
Review scores
Source	Rating
AllMusic	3.5/5 stars
The Daily Telegraph	5/5 stars
The Native	8.4/10
NME	5/5 stars
Pulse Nigeria	7.7/10

More Love, Less Ego was met with "universal acclaim" reviews from critics. At Metacritic, which assigns a weighted average rating out of 100 to reviews from mainstream publications, this release received an average score of 87, based on 4 reviews.

Nigerian-based music magazine The Native did a review on More Love, Less Ego, in which it stated that the album "still sounds pristine and does not suffer from any deals", also noting that he brings new collaborators "into his colourful world where ego takes a back seat to the pursuit of love and genuine human connections". Writing for NME, Kyann-Sian Williams gave the "appropriately-titled" album a perfect five-star review and felt that it "is a masterful connection that sees Wizkid beginning to truly perfect his universal pop sound". they also praised the title of the album, opining that it "wishes to replicate the musicality of" Wizkid's previous album, Made in Lagos (2020), "using similar sonic templates - steady flowing melody, top production, and rich features while discussing the stress-free, wealthy, and hedonistic lifestyle of a megastar", while also positively writing that it "offers sonic coherence achieved through incredible sound engineering that delivers the luxurious sound needed to elevate the content and offer gratification".

=== Accolades ===
Year	Awards ceremony	Award description(s)	Results
2023	Trace Awards & Festival	Album of the Year	Nominated

== Track listing ==
More Love, Less Ego track listing
No.	Title	Writer(s)	Producer(s)	Length
1.	"Money & Love"	Ayodeji Balogun; Richard Isong; Marco Bernardis; Ifeoluwa Ogunjobi	P2J	3:11
2.	"Balance"	Balogun; Peter Amba	Kel-P; KDaGreat	3:01
3.	"Bad to Me"	Balogun; Isong; Samuel Awuku	P2J; Sammy Soso^{[a]}	2:58
4.	"2 Sugar" (featuring Ayra Starr)	Balogun; Oyinkansola Aderibigbe; Isong	P2J	3:07
5.	"Everyday"	Balogun; Isong; Awuku	P2J; Sammy Soso	3:20
6.	"Slip n Slide" (featuring Skillibeng and Shenseea)	Balogun; Emwah Warmington; Chinsea Lee; Isong; Bernardis	P2J	3:29
7.	"Deep"	Balogun; Isong; Austin Iwar; Malik Venner; Bernardis	P2J	2:34
8.	"Flower Pads"	Balogun; Isong; Awuku; Kevin Ekofo	P2J; Sammy Soso^{[b]}	3:27
9.	"Wow" (featuring Skepta and Naira Marley)	Balogun; Joseph Adenuga; Naira Marley; Isong	P2J	2:59
10.	"Pressure"	Balogun; Peace Oredope	P Priime	3:02
11.	"Plenty Loving"	Balogun; Isong; Bernardis; Gaetan Judd	P2J	2:51
12.	"Special" (featuring Don Toliver)	Balogun; Caleb Toliver; Julian Nicco-Annan; Godwin Sonzi	Juls	3:23
13.	"Frames (Who's Gonna Know)"	Balogun; Iwar; Isong; Ekofo; Jamal Europe	P2J; Kofo^{[b]}; Euro^{[b]}	3:25
Total length:				40:55

Notes

- ^[a] signifies an additional producer
- ^[b] signifies a co-producer

== Charts ==
Chart performance for More Love, Less Ego
Chart (2022–2024)	Peak position
Australian Hitseekers Albums (ARIA)	10
Belgian Albums (Ultratop Flanders)	91
Belgian Albums (Ultratop Wallonia)	157
Canadian Albums (Billboard)	45
Dutch Albums (Album Top 100)	30
French Albums (SNEP)	135
Irish Albums (IRMA)	100
Swiss Albums (Schweizer Hitparade)	54
UK Albums (OCC)	16
UK R&B Albums (OCC)	15
US Billboard 200	59
US World Albums (Billboard)	2
