= Essence (Wizkid song) =

2020 single by Wizkid featuring Tems

Single by Wizkid featuring Tems

from the album Made in Lagos
- Released: 30 October 2020
- Genre: Afrobeats; R&B
- Length: 4:08
- Label: Starboy; RCA
- Songwriters: Ayodeji Balogun; Temilade Openiyi; Uzezi Oniko; Okiemute Oniko; Richard Isong
- Producers: Legendury Beatz; P2J

Wizkid singles chronology
"Ginger" (2020)	"Essence" (2020)	"B. d'Or" (2021)

Tems singles chronology
"Damages" (2020)	"Essence" (2021)	"Crazy Tings" (2021)

Music video
- "Essence" on YouTube

"Essence" is a song by Nigerian singer and songwriter Wizkid, featuring fellow Nigerian singer Tems. It was released on 30 October 2020, as the fourth single from Wizkid's fourth studio album, Made in Lagos. "Essence" was produced by P2J and Legendury Beatz. The "sensual" song sees the duo express their desire for each other. A music video was released on 9 April 2021, shot in Aburi in the Eastern Region of Ghana. "Essence" is the first Nigerian song in history to chart on the Billboard Hot 100 and the Billboard Global 200. The song received a nomination at the 64th Annual Grammy Awards for Best Global Music Performance.

== Background and composition ==
After the song garnered popularity, Tems said that although she was "happy" with her first recording of the song, she felt her verse could have been better. However, Wizkid and his team thought her vocals were great and ultimately kept it. Tems recalled hearing the song "in the most random places", while in Los Angeles.

"Essence" is an Afrobeats/Afro-pop and R&B song. Lyrically, it sees Wizkid and Tems yearning for each other's physical connection; deemed a "flirtatious" song, the artists deliver "tongue-in-cheek showboating". As observed by NPR's Sidney Madden, the song features Tems singing the chorus about how only her lover can give her the feeling of "lust and obsession and worship that she deserves", with the lyrics "You don't need no other body. You don't need no other body".

== Critical reception ==
Henrietta Taylor of Nigerian publication DST lauded the collaboration, writing: "The Nigerian artists make a formidable duo in the glossy Afrobeats single, with the more established Wizkid giving rising-star Tems a platform to give listeners a glimpse of her knock-out vocals". Praising the chorus as "the hook that keeps on giving", NPR's Sidney Madden opined that the song was not immediately appreciated, due to COVID-19, writing: "this song didn't really get the justice or even the fair playing field it deserved because we were all inside, we were all quarantined. But now that concerts and outdoor picnics and anywhere where the communal experience of music is appreciated is coming back, this song is going to be everywhere, and it's going to continue to go up". Calling the track a perfect mix of Afropop and R&B, Pan African Music said the duo "present an ode to lust" as they "embody sexual desire, advocating a sense of reciprocity". Regina Cho of Revolt deemed the song a stand-out from Made in Lagos, calling Tems's verse "sensual". GRM Daily's Courtney W called it a "silky, smooth" offering. Conversely, NME called the track "expendable".

=== Critics rankings and year-end lists ===
In 2021, "Essence" was ranked as the number one best song of 2021 by American magazine Rolling Stone. "Essence" was included in Spotify's Song of the Summer playlist in June 2021, and in Barack Obama's favourite songs of 2020 playlist. In April 2023, African Folder's staff listed Essence as one of the best African songs of all time.

In October 2023, Billboard's staff ranked "Essence" as number 407 in their Best Pop Songs of all Time. Time named it the second best song of 2021.

== Cultural impact ==
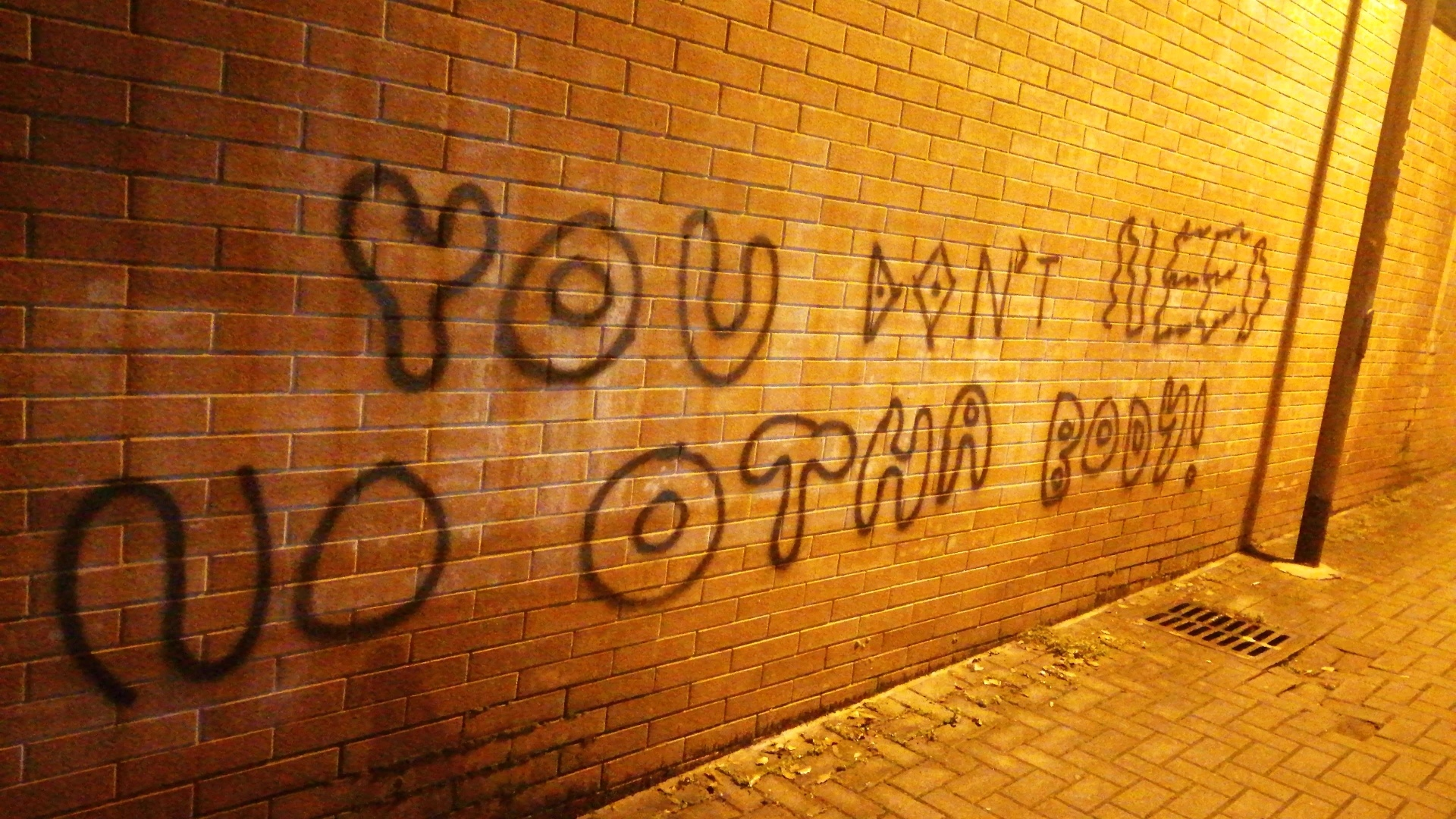
Graffiti work in Bologna, Italy, quoting lyrics from the song

The Native opined "the song became an ubiquitous presence among listeners, and led to another cultural moment engineered by Wizkid. Billboard staff's remarked that "the song is a big moment for not only the artists involved but for Afrobeats as a global genre, and “Essence” is blazing the trail for more crossover Afrobeats hits to follow suit". The Guardian asserted that "Essence is not just a hit song; it’s a cultural bridge, It has introduced the vibrant sounds of Afrobeats to a wider audience and paved the way for other African artists to reach international success". American rapper Kanye West called Essence "The best song in history." It was named the globe-trotting song of the summer by critics, and became the soundtrack to an optimistic re-emergence after a dark and isolated winter. Time also called the song a ubiquitous hit that contains luxurious sonic experiences of the year. Daniel Anazia of "The Guardian" wrote that "Essence is a success that has spiraled into a moment for Afrobeats". Chris DeVille of Stereogum said "Essence was a perfect encapsulation of a feeling, and its success may portend further chart success for WizKid, Tems, and their African peers". In an interview, American rapper Nicki Minaj argued that Essence should have been better recognised by the Grammys for Song of the year. Liam Hess of Vogue wrote “Essence was literally inescapable and elevated Afrobeats crossover into the U.S. market, even before Justin Bieber jumped on the record." Legit.ng described the song as "another landmark defining moment for Afrobeats." "Billboard" named Essence's Hot 100 top 10 entry as one of the 25 musical moments that defined the first quarter of the 2020s, while saying; "it's a moment for Afrobeats in general, signaling to the industry that the ascendant genre had real staying power on American radio".

== Music video ==
The music video was released on 9 April 2021. Directed by Director K of PriorGold Pictures, and produced by Leke Alabi Isama, it was shot in Accra, Ghana. It was the fourth video to be released from Made in Lagos. The visual sees Wizkid and Tems lounging in the streets of Accra, while Wizkid is later seen riding in a car with two women. The video was considered "colourful" and "scintillating", with GRM Daily saying, "The visuals perfectly coincide with the track's blissful feel and include colourful fits, scenic shots and good vibes". Rolling Stone said the artists "glow, Wiz bare-chested and draped in diamonds, Tems in slick braids and flowing garb".

== Justin Bieber remix ==
"Essence" (remix)

Single by Wizkid featuring Justin Bieber and Tems

from the album Made in Lagos (deluxe edition)
- Released: 13 August 2021
- Genre: Afrobeats; R&B
- Length: 4:23
- Label: Starboy; RCA
- Songwriters: Ayodeji Balogun; Justin Bieber; Temilade Openiyi; Uzezi Oniko; Okiemute Oniko; Richard Isong
- Producer: Legendury Beatz

Justin Bieber singles chronology
"Stay" (2021)	"Essence" (remix) (2021)	"Don't Go" (2021)

Lyric video
- "Essence" (remix) on YouTube

A remix of "Essence" featuring additional vocals from Canadian singer Justin Bieber was released on 13 August 2021, and appears on the deluxe edition of Made in Lagos.

== Accolades ==
Awards and nominations for "Essence"
Year	Organization	Award	Result	Ref(s)
2021	All Africa Music Awards	Best African Collaboration	Won	
2021	All Africa Music Awards	Song of the Year in Africa	Won	
2021	African Entertainment Awards USA	Best Collaboration	Won	
2021	African Entertainment Awards USA	Best Video	Won	
2021	African Entertainment Awards USA	Song of the Year	Won	
2021	Soul Train Music Awards	Best Collaboration	Won	
2021	Soul Train Music Awards	Video of the Year	Nominated	
2021	Soul Train Music Awards	Song of the Year	Nominated	
2021	Soul Train Music Awards	The Ashford & Simpson Songwriter's Award	Nominated	
2022	Grammy Awards	Best Global Music Performance	Nominated	
2022	iHeartRadio Music Awards	Hip Hop Song of the Year	Nominated	
2022	NAACP Image Awards	Outstanding Music Video/Visual Album	Won	
2022	NAACP Image Awards	Outstanding International Song	Won	
2022	3Music Awards	African Song of the Year	Won	
2022	BET Awards	Best Collaboration	Won	

== Credits and personnel ==
Credits adapted from Tidal.

- Wizkid – vocals, songwriting
- Tems – vocals, songwriting
- Legendury Beatz
  - Uzezi Oniko – songwriting, production
  - Mut4y – songwriting, production
- P2J – songwriting, production
- Colin Leonard – mastering
- Leandro Hidalgo – mixing

=== Remix only ===
- Justin Bieber – vocals, songwriting
- Heidi Wang – assistant engineering
- Benjamin Rice – engineering
- Josh Gudwin – recording, vocal production

== Charts ==
=== Weekly charts ===
Weekly chart performance for "Essence"
Chart (2021–2022) (Note: Chart peaks in Canada, Global 200 and the US Hot 100 measure combined data between the original and the Justin Bieber remix version.)	Peak position
Nigeria (TurnTable Top 50)	3
Canada Hot 100 (Billboard)	30
Global 200 (Billboard)	28
Ireland (IRMA)	41
Netherlands (Single Top 100)	76
New Zealand (Recorded Music NZ)	15
Portugal (AFP)	108
South Africa (TOSAC)	15
Sweden Heatseeker (Sverigetopplistan)	1
Switzerland (Schweizer Hitparade)	95
UK Singles (Official Charts)	16
UK Afrobeats (Official Charts)	1
US Billboard Hot 100	9
US Afrobeats Songs (Billboard)	1
US Hot R&B/Hip-Hop Songs (Billboard)	3
US Pop Airplay (Billboard)	21
US R&B/Hip-Hop Airplay (Billboard)	1
US Rhythmic Airplay (Billboard)	2
US Rolling Stone Top 100	11
US World Digital Song Sales (Billboard)	1

=== Year-end charts ===
2021 year-end chart performance for "Essence"
Chart (2021)	Position
Global 200 (Billboard)	195
UK Singles (OCC)	97
US Billboard Hot 100	60
US Hot R&B/Hip-Hop Songs (Billboard)	28
US Rhythmic (Billboard)	29

2022 year-end chart performance for "Essence"
Chart (2022)	Position
US Billboard Hot 100	64
US Afrobeats Songs (Billboard)	1
US Hot R&B/Hip-Hop Songs (Billboard)	35

2023 year-end chart performance for "Essence"
Chart (2023)	Position
US Afrobeats Songs (Billboard)	4

== Certifications ==
Certifications for "Essence"
Region	Certification	Certified units/sales
Canada (Music Canada)	3× Platinum	240,000^{‡}
France (SNEP)	Gold	100,000^{‡}
New Zealand (RMNZ)	3× Platinum	90,000^{‡}
Nigeria (TCSN)	2× Platinum	200,000^{‡}
South Africa (RISA)	7× Platinum	140,000^{‡}
Switzerland (IFPI Switzerland)	Platinum	20,000^{‡}
United Kingdom (BPI)	Platinum	600,000^{‡}
United States (RIAA)	5× Platinum	5,000,000^{‡}
Portugal (AFP)	Gold	12,000^{‡}
Belgium (BRMA)	Gold	20,000^{‡}
^{‡} Sales+streaming figures based on certification alone.

== Release history ==
Release history and formats for "Essence"
Country	Date	Format	Label	Ref.
Various	30 October 2020	Digital download; streaming	Starboy; RCA	
United States	29 June 2021	Urban radio	Starboy; RCA	
