= Ginger (Wizkid song) =

Single by Wizkid featuring Burna Boy

from the album Made in Lagos
- Released: January 8, 2021
- Genre: Afrobeats; R&B; hip-hop
- Length: 3:16
- Label: Starboy; RCA
- Songwriters: Richard Isong; Ayodeji Ibrahim Balogun; Damini Ebunoluwa Ogulu; Peter Kelvin Amba Udoma
- Producers: P2J; Kel-P

Wizkid singles chronology
"Omo Olomo" (2020)	"Ginger" (2021)	"Essence" (2021)

Burna Boy singles chronology
"20 10 20" (2020)	"Ginger" (2020)	"Kilometre" (2021)

Music video
- "Ginger" on YouTube

“Ginger” is a song by Nigerian singer Wizkid featuring fellow Nigerian singer Burna Boy. It was released as the third single off Wizkid's fourth studio album Made in Lagos on 8 January 2021. "Ginger" was produced by P2J and Kel-P. "Ginger" makes history on Monday, 9 November 2020, as the first No. 1 song on TurnTable Top 50 chart.

== Music video ==
The music video was released on January 8, 2021. The video was produced by JM Films and directed by Meji Alabi.

== Charts ==
Chart (2020)	Peak position
Nigeria (TurnTable Top 50)	1
UK Singles (OCC)	67
UK Afrobeats (OCC)	1
US Afrobeats Songs (Billboard)	25

== Certifications ==
Certifications for "Ginger"
Region	Certification	Certified units/sales
Canada (Music Canada)	Gold	40,000^{‡}
South Africa (RISA)	2× Platinum	40,000^{‡}
Switzerland (IFPI Switzerland)	Gold	10,000^{‡}
United Kingdom (BPI)	Silver	200,000^{‡}
United States (RIAA)	Gold	500,000^{‡}
^{‡} Sales+streaming figures based on certification alone.

== Release history ==
Release history and formats for "Ginger"
Country	Date	Format	Label	Ref.
Various	29 October 2020	Digital download; streaming	Starboy; RCA	
