= Morayo (album) =

Studio album by Wizkid
- Released: November 22, 2024
- Genres: Afrobeats; R&B
- Length: 47:18
- Languages: English; Yoruba; Nigerian Pidgin
- Labels: RCA; Starboy
- Producers: AoD; Ari PenSmith; Marco Bernardis; Brent Faiyaz; Damedame*; Dpat; The Elements; Gaetan Judd; P2J; P.Priime; Sammy Soso; T.Y. Jake

Wizkid chronology
S2 (2023)	Morayo (2024)	Real, Vol. 1 (2026)

Singles from Morayo
- 1. "Piece of My Heart" Released: 18 October 2024; 2. "Kese (Dance)" Released: 15 November 2024

Morayo is the sixth studio album by Nigerian singer Wizkid. It was released on 22 November 2024 through RCA Records and Starboy Entertainment. The album features guest appearances from Asake, Anaïs Cardot, Brent Faiyaz, Jazmine Sullivan, and Tiakola. Production was primarily handled by P2J, with contributions from others. The album was promoted by two singles, "Piece of My Heart" with Brent Faiyaz and "Kese (Dance)".

== Background ==
The album's title and cover are dedicated to Wizkid's mother Jane Balogun, who died in London in August 2023. Morayo is the middle name of his mother, Juliana Morayo Balogun, and is the Yoruba word for "I see joy". The album cover is a cropped image of his mother.

== Release and promotion ==
On 4 July 2024, his mother's birthday, Wizkid confirmed the album's existence on Twitter.

MORAYO!! Best album I ever made!! Now listen! It’s only up from here! ❤️🦅

On 18 October 2024, Wizkid released the single "Piece of My Heart" with Brent Faiyaz. Less than a month later, this was followed by "Kese (Dance)". Both singles broke the record for the biggest single debut in Spotify Nigeria history. On 8 November, Wizkid revealed the album cover and release date.

== Critical reception ==
Professional ratings
Review scores
Source	Rating
African Folder	7/10
The Native	8.3/10
NotJustOk	7.0/10
Pulse Nigeria	7.0/10
Premium Times	7/10
Rolling Stone	3.5/5 stars
NME	5/5 stars
Clash	8/10
Afrocritik	7.8/10

Morayo was met with generally positive reception from music critics. Pulse Nigeria's Adeayo Adebiyi, rating it a 7.0/10, said that Morayo has "something in it for everyone" and contains "stellar productions that don't demand too much from Wizkid who maintains the lush fusion he favours." Mankaprr Conteh of Rolling Stone said the album was "sturdy but unsurprising," praising its production and calling it "a warm hug than a packed punch." Philemon Jacob of African Folder described the album as an "offering of a superstar who has come to terms with his legacy," adding that it's "not groundbreaking, but it's not unimpressive" and saying that it'll fall below the expectations of people who wanted Wizkid to head in a new direction. He rated it a 7/10.

Damilare Abioye, writing for Nigerian Entertainment Today, characterized it as a "love letter to his mother, his legacy and his roots." Nosakhale Akhimien of Premium Times praised the album's "emotional depth and thematic cohesion," adding that it's "not [his] most groundbreaking work, but it's a heartfelt celebration of his roots, artistry, and enduring legacy" and rating it a 7/10. Boluwatife Adeyemi of the Native gave it an 8.3/10, stating that "On Morayo, Wizkid seems to find solace in what works." Ademoye Afeez of NotJustOk called Morayo "a solid addition to Wizkid's catalogue" due to its "rich and robust soundscape, instrumentation, and production" but noted that it "lacks a unifying thematic structure" and rated it a 7.0/10.

=== Accolades ===
Year	Awards ceremony	Award description(s)	Results	Ref
2026	The Headies	Album of the Year	Pending	
2026	The Headies	Afrobeats Album of the Year	Pending	

== Track listing ==
Morayo track listing
No.	Title	Writer(s)	Producer(s)	Length
1.	"Troubled Mind"	Ayodeji Balogun; Marco Bernardis; Richard Isong; Gaetan Judd	Judd; Bernardis; P2J	3:02
2.	"Karamo"	Balogun; R. Isong	P2J; Judd^{[a]}	2:41
3.	"Kese (Dance)"	Balogun; R. Isong	P2J	2:54
4.	"Bad Girl" (featuring Asake)	Balogun; Ahmed Ololade; Peace Oredope	P.Priime	2:54
5.	"Time"	Balogun; R. Isong; Elomaina Mafeni	P2J	3:07
6.	"Piece of My Heart" (featuring Brent Faiyaz)	Balogun; Alan Bergman; Marilyn Bergman; Dennis Coles; JuLeus Cornelius; Robert Diggs; Andrew Dineen; Gary Grice; Marvin Hamlisch; Lamont Hawkins; Jason Hunter; Ariowa Irosogie; R. Isong; Austin Iwar; Russell Jones; Clifford Smith; Christopher Wood; Corey Woods	Brent Faiyaz; Dpat; P2J; Drew80^{[a]}; JuiceCuice^{[a]}	4:19
7.	"Break Me Down"	Balogun; Barbara Boko; Edith Nelson; Emmanuel Isong; R. Isong	Damedame*; P2J	3:21
8.	"Bend"	Balogun; R. Isong; Judd	Judd; P2J	2:33
9.	"A Million Blessings"	Balogun; Paul Goller; R. Isong; Keven Wolfsohn	P2J; The Elements	3:10
10.	"Après Minuit" (featuring Tiakola)	Balogun; Emma Fettomi; R. Isong; Judd; William Mundala; Georges Mundende; Camille Yembe	P2J; Judd^{[a]}	2:57
11.	"Bad for You" (featuring Jazmine Sullivan)	Balogun; Jake Hogan; R. Isong; Jazmine Sullivan	P2J; T.Y. Jake; Judd^{[a]}; Bernardis^{[a]}	2:50
12.	"Soji"	Balogun; Oredope	P.Priime	2:38
13.	"Don't Care"	Balogun; Samuel Awuku; Irosogie; R. Isong	Ari PenSmith; P2J; Sammy Soso	2:11
14.	"Slow" (featuring Anaïs Cardot)	Anaïs Cardot; R. Isong; Alastair O'Donnell; Oredope	AoD; P.Priime; P2J	3:25
15.	"Lose"	Balogun; R. Isong; Judd; Nicola Sipprell	Judd; P2J	2:18
16.	"Pray"	Balogun; Awuku; O'Donnell; R. Isong	AoD; P2J; Sammy Soso	2:52
Total length:				47:18

Notes

- ^{^[a]} signifies an additional producer.
- "Piece of My Heart" contains samples of "Can It All Be So Simple" by Wu-Tang Clan and "The Way We Were" by Gladys Knight & the Pips.

== Personnel ==
Musicians

- Wizkid – vocals
- Moses Olukayode – drums on "Troubled Mind" and "Kese (Dance)"
- Ife Ogunjobi – trumpet on "Karamo"
- Gaetan Judd – guitar on "Kese (Dance)"
- Marco Bernardis – saxophone on "Kese (Dance)"
- Dayna J. Fisher – bass on "Time"
- AoD – guitar on "Time"

Technical

- Dale Becker – mastering
- Sam Harper – mixing, engineering
- Adam Lunn – engineering on "Bend"
- Adam Burt – engineering assistance
- Brandon Hernandez – engineering assistance
- Noah McCorkle – engineering assistance

== Charts ==
Chart performance for Morayo
Chart (2024)	Peak position
Belgian Albums (Ultratop Flanders)	170
Belgian Albums (Ultratop Wallonia)	148
Canadian Albums (Billboard)	48
Dutch Albums (Album Top 100)	87
French Albums (SNEP)	84
Irish Albums (Official Charts)	50
Nigerian Albums (TurnTable)	1
Portuguese Albums (AFP)	181
Swiss Albums (Schweizer Hitparade)	35
UK Albums (Official Charts)	14
US Billboard 200	98
US World Albums (Billboard)	4
