= Cardot =

Cardot (English: /kɑːrˈdoʊ/, French: [kaʁdo]) is a French surname. Notable people with the surname include:

- Anaïs Cardot, French-Gabonese singer-songwriter
- Jean Cardot (1930–2020), French sculptor
- Jules Cardot (1860–1934), French botanist and bryologist
- Marie-Hélène Cardot (1899–1977), French resistance fighter and politician
