= Nonso Amadi =

Nigerian musician (born 1995)

- Amadi in 2018

Background information
- Born: Chinonso Obinna Amadi; September 1, 1995 (age 31); Lagos, Nigeria
- Genres: Afro R&B; Alté; Afropop
- Occupations: Singer; songwriter; Record Producer
- Years active: 2012 - present
- Labels: Universal Music Canada; Def Jam; Universal Music Group Nigeria; Polydor Records; MCA Records France
- Website: nonsoamadi.com

Chinonso Obinna Amadi (born September 1, 1995) is a Nigerian singer, songwriter and music producer. He is a self-taught songwriter and music producer who embarked on his music career in 2012, while at Covenant University, where he studied chemical engineering. He is signed to UMG Canada, Def Jam Recordings, UMG Nigeria, Polydor, and MCA Records France.

== Early life ==
Nonso Amadi was born on September 1, 1995, to Nigerian parents. He is the third born in a family of seven and grew up in Nigeria before moving to United Kingdom.

== Education ==
He attended St Gregory’s College Ikoyi, Lagos and graduated in 2009. He studied chemical engineering in Covenant University, and in 2014 he continued his studies at Swansea University United Kingdom. He holds a master's degree from McMaster University, Canada.

== Career ==
In 2015, Nonso Amadi released his first EP, Alone, and a few months later he released a follow-up single, "Tonight", which became his major hit and peaked at number 9 on Playdata charts. He has so far garnered international attention and collaboration with artists such as Banky W., Maleek Berry, M.I, and Juls within the first year of his professional career. In December 2017, "Tonight" was ranked by MTV Base as one of the hottest Nigerian songs of the year. In the same month, he held his first 'Homecoming Concert' in Nigeria. In 2017, he released a four-track joint EP with fellow singer Odunsi the Engine titled WAR EP.

In 2019, Amadi released another solo EP titled Free featuring collaborations with Mr. Eazi. and Simi. After a three-year hiatus, he returned to the music scene in 2022 with a new single titled "Foreigner" followed by another single featuring the Canadian Rnb duo Majid Jordan titled "Different". On 1 September 2022, he released "Eye to Eye", with its accompanying music video which debuted on MTV Base Africa. On 20 January 2023, Nonso released "Ease Up", co-produced by him with Gordon Harper, and TJ Whitelaw.

On 20 March 2023, Nonso teamed up with BEAM on "Kilimanjaro", as the fifth lead single off his upcoming debut studio album When It Blooms. The record "Kilimanjaro" also premiered on Apple Music’s Africa Now Radio, with Daddaboy Ehiz. On 24 March 2023, Nonso released "Lock Up" featuring Marlian recording artist Zinoleesky. On 27 April 2023, "Lock Up" music video which released and directed by Joe Penny. Before the release of his debut studio album When It Blooms, Nonso Amadi signed a distribution deal with Def Jam Recordings, and Universal Music Nigeria, to support his record deal with Universal Music Canada, backed-up by Polydor Records and MCA Records France.

On 26 May 2023, Nonso Amadi released When It Blooms through Def Jam Recordings, and Universal Music Group flagship in Canada and Nigeria. The project was exclusively produced by Nonso Amadi, with additional production from London, Harper Gordon, CAPTAIN, FrancisGotHeat, Azul, P.Priime, Goldchain, Dëra, TSB, Mont Jake, Jordan Ullman, and TJ Whitelaw. Featuring guest appearances from Beam, Zinoleesky, Tay Iwar, Tamera, and Majid Jordan., supported by lead singles "Kilimanjaro", and "Lock Up".

On 26 January 2024, Nonso and Emotional Oranges released a joint 4-track extended play titled Blended, and released through Avant Garden Records.

== Artistry ==
Nonso Amadi is known for fusing Afrobeats elements with R&B. In an interview with Wonderland, he says: “I would say it is Afro-RnB music.”

== Discography ==
=== Albums ===
List of studio albums, with selected details and chart positions
Title	Details	Peak chart positions
Title	Details	NG
When It Blooms	Released: 26 May 2023; Label: Universal Music Canada, Def Jam, Universal Music Nigeria; Formats: Digital download	27

=== Extended plays ===
List of extended plays, with selected details and chart positions
Title	Details	Peak chart positions
Title	Details	NG
Alone	Released: 27 July 2015; Formats: Digital download	—
War - EP (with. Odunsi the Engine)	Released: 29 April 2017; Formats: Digital download	—
Free	Released: 9 August 2019; Formats: Digital download	—
Blended (with. Emotional Oranges)	Released: 26 January 2024; Label: Avant Garden Records; Formats: Digital download	—
TO CRY A FLOOD	Released: 14 November 2025; Label: Universal Music Canada; Formats: Digital download	—

=== Singles ===
==== As lead artist ====
List of singles as lead artist, with year released and album shown
Title	Year	Peak chart positions							Certifications	Album
Title	Year	NG	NG Afropop	SA	UK	UK Afrobeats	US	US Afrobeats	Certifications	Album
"Radio	2016	—	—	—	—	—	—	—		Non-album single
"Tonight"	2016	9	—	—	—	—	—	—		Non-album single
"Kwasia" (feat. Eugy)	2017	—	—	—	—	—	—	—		Non-album single
"Long Live the Queen"	2017	—	—	—	—	—	—	—		Non-album single
"Aika"	2017	—	—	—	—	—	—	—		Non-album single
"No Crime"	2018	—	—	—	—	—	—	—		Free
"Dial Me" (feat. Kida Kudz)	2018	—	—	—	—	—	—	—		Non-album single
"Emergency"	2019	—	—	—	—	—	—	—		Non-album single
"Comfortable" (feat. Kwesi Arthur)	2019	—	—	—	—	—	—	—		Non-album single
"Kolo" (with. Paul Play)	2020	—	—	—	—	—	—	—		Non-album single
"Foreigner"	2022	—	—	—	—	—	—	—		When It Blooms
"Different" (with. Majid Jordan)	2022	—	—	—	—	—	—	—		When It Blooms
"Eye to Eye"	2022	—	—	—	—	—	—	—		When It Blooms
"Ease Up"	2023	—	—	—	—	—	—	—		When It Blooms
"Kilimanjaro"	2023	70	46	—	—	—	—	—		When It Blooms
"Lock Up" (with. Zinoleesky)	2023	56	—	—	—	—	—	—		When It Blooms
"Nowhere" (with. Emotional Oranges)	2023	—	—	—	—	—	—	—		Blended
"Foreigner (Remix)" (with. Chase Shakur, and Projexx)	2023	—	—	—	—	—	—	—		Non-album single
"Paper (Tumelo_za & SjavasDaDeejay Remix)" (with. Tumelo_za, and SjavasDaDeejay)	2024	—	—	—	—	—	—	—		Non-album single
"Call On Me" (with. Chrissy Spratt, and Serøtonin)	2025	—	—	—	—	—	—	—		Maybe Next Time
"PILLOW"	2025	—	—	—	—	—	—	—		TO CRY A FLOOD
"DIVE IN"	2025	—	—	—	—	—	—	—		TO CRY A FLOOD

==== As featured artist ====
List of singles as featured artist, with year released, selected chart positions, certifications, and album name shown
Title	Year	Peak chart positions							Certifications	Album
Title	Year	NG	NG Afropop	SA	UK	UK Afrobeats	US	US Afrobeats	Certifications	Album
"Falling" (Jay Newton feat. Nonso Amadi)	2018	—	—	—	—	—	—	—		TBA
"I'm Yours" (Kofi feat. Nonso Amadi)	2022	—	—	—	—	—	—	—		Just To Piss You Off
"Closure (Remix)" (Savannah Ré feat. Nonso Amadi)	2023	—	—	—	—	—	—	—		TBA
"Danger" (Pronto feat. Nonso Amadi)	2023	—	—	—	—	—	—	—		TBA
"Spaceman (Remix Nonso Amadi)" (Jujuboy feat. Nonso Amadi)	2023	—	—	—	—	—	—	—		Non-album single
"Danger (RMX)" (Pronto feat. Nonso Amadi, & Epoque)	2023	—	—	—	—	—	—	—		Non-album single
"Daily (Remix)" (Ryan Ofei, Limoblaze, & Nonso Amadi feat. Becca Folkes)	2023	—	—	—	—	—	—	—		Non-album single
"Back 2 Love" (Kito featuring Wafia & Nonso Amadi)	2024	—	—	—	—	—	—	—		TBA
"Babyboo" (Sylo featuring Nonso Amadi)	2024	—	—	—	—	—	—	—		Dreamt that I Was

=== Other charted songs ===
List of other charted songs, with year released, selected chart positions, certification and album name shown
Title	Year	Peak chart positions							Certifications	Album
Title	Year	NG	NG AfroR&B	SA	UK	UK Afrobeats	US	US Afrobeats	Certifications	Album
"Pieces" (with. Tay Iwar)	2023	— (Note: "Pieces" did not enter Nigeria Top 100, but peaked at number 13 on the Bubbling Under Top 100 chart.)	13	—	—	—	—	—		When It Blooms
