= Suté Iwar =

Nigerian record producer

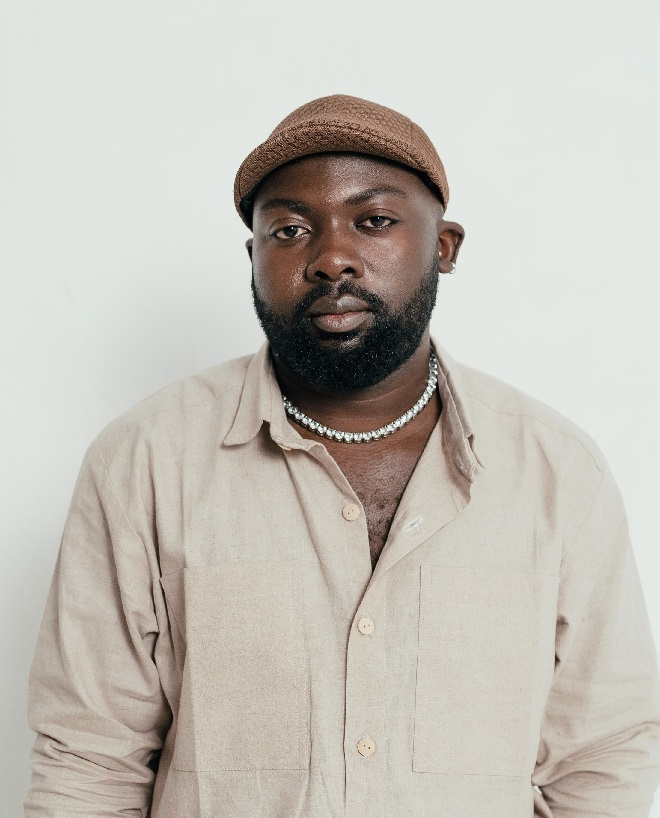
- Suté Iwar in 2022
- Born: Msughter Wuese Iwar; 14 November 1992 (age 33); Makurdi, Benue State, Nigeria
- Education: Maynooth University
- Occupations: rapper; record producer; singer; songwriter; composer; sound engineer; music archivist; music journalist
- Years active: 2013–present
- Relatives: Tay Iwar (Brother); Terna Iwar (Brother)
- Musical career
- Also known as: Suté
- Genres: Afrofusion; Afrobeats; Hip Hop; R&B; Nu-Funk; Alté
- Instruments: Vocals, guitar, piano, saxophone
- Labels: BANTU; Outer South
- Member of: BANTU Collective
- Website: www.suteiwar.com

Msughter Wuese Iwar (born 14 November 1992), professionally known as Suté Iwar, is a Nigerian Afro-Fusion rapper, singer-songwriter, and record producer, signed to Outer South, and co-founder of the BANTU Collective, with his brothers Tay Iwar, and Terna Iwar. His debut into the limelight was met with critical acclaim when he released his second mixtape Visions.

He rose to stardom in 2022, following the release of "alright, ok", which became his breakout song into the mainstream. In 2023, Suté gained international recognition with the release of his studio album ULTRALIGHT. The project spawned the hit tracks including "Judah Lion" featuring WurlD, and "MEDITATE", featuring Lex Amor and Tay Iwar, premiered on BBC Radio 1Xtra's R&B Show.

== Early life ==
Msughter Iwar was born on 14 November 1992 in Makurdi. At around the age of 7, he began music lessons at the classical music school, MUSON Centre, Onikan. He began recording his own music around the age of 13, after being introduced to recording software by friends. In 2013, Sute Iwar had a brief stint as a music journalist, and wrote for OkayAfrica.

== Career ==
In 2014, Iwar began producing and releasing music on SoundCloud, with the stage name Suté. That year, he released a series of 3 short EPs titled Anecdotes. He followed that with the release his first mixtape Jelí, which was supported by the singles "Badagry" and "Enwonwu" featuring Tay Iwar, and released on the 13 July 2014. He was a featured artist on Lady Donli's "Mr. Creeper", and was produced by Tay Iwar (production credit as Tay) released on August 12, 2014. In 2015, he appeared on LeriQ studio album The Lost Sounds, on the track "Smell Of Success" with Show Dem Camp, and Tay Iwar, released on 28 August 2015.

November 14, 2015, saw the release of his second mixtape titled Vision, which spawned the sleeper hit track "Mainland Cruise". In 2018, Iwar released his third mixtape Paradise, followed by the COLORS EP released on September 4, 2020. On June 18, 2021, Iwar released his first long play project titled 199X, which debuted at number 1 on Apple Music Nigeria's alternative album chart. On 6 May 2022, he released "alright, ok", and the music video was released on 24 May 2022. In 2022, Iwar was featured on "All My Days", a song by Nigerian producer, singer, and songwriter Killertunes.

Iwar, released his debut studio album titled ULTRALIGHT, through Outer South on April 21, 2023. The album features guest appearances from WurlD, Tim Lyre, Lex Amor, kadiata, Raytheboffin, Tay Iwar, Shalom Dubas, Ogranya, Efe Oraka and Twelve XII. ULTRALIGHT received positive reviews from music critics like Dennis Ade Peter reviewing for The Native: 7.5/10, and Adeayo Adebiyi reviewing for Pulse Nigeria: 7.8/10. On 27 April 2023, Billboard cited "SHUGA PEACH" from the album, as one of its Best Afrobeats Songs of the Month. Billboard writer Heran Mamo, and Dan Rys in a review said: “Harry Styles "Watermelon Sugar" — has found its African counterpart: Suté Iwar’s “SHUGA PEACH.” Listeners can sink their teeth into this juicy song.” On 29 April 2023, BBC Radio 1Xtra premiered "MEDITATE" on the 1Xtra's R&B Show.

On 5 May 2023, ULTRALIGHT cited by Bandcamp Daily on its list of The Best Soul on Bandcamp: April 2023 edition led by Baby Rose's album Through and Through. On May 3, 2023, Iwar released the music video for "MEDITATE". Speaking on the visual, he told Wonderland: "The music video is a representation of our deep connection with virtual reality and our innate desire to escape into the digital world and chase our fantasies – an urge that is common in the age of social media." On 19 May 2023, he headlined his first UK show at The Grace, London with guest appearances from Tay Iwar, Tim Lyre, and kadiata. On 29 September 2023, he released a house version of "Earth Angel", off his studio album ULTRALIGHT, and released as "Earth Angel (Midnight Manoeuvres Remix)". On 16 February 2024, Iwar released a 2 pack-single titled "Clear", and "Rinse & Repeat".

Iwar was part of the 2024 OneBeat musical program, held in the United States.

=== Publishing and licensing deal ===
Iwar signed an international publishing deal with Soundway Publishing, a unit of the British record label Soundway Records.

In 2022, Iwar signed a licensing deal with Outer South.

== Selected publications ==
- MTV EMA 'Best African Act' Nominations Round-Up (2013)
- Our Picks For Festivals In Africa: July 2013 (2013)
- Burna Boy's Album Debut 'L.I.F.E' (2013)

== Artistry ==
Suté Iwar is a proficient rapper and singer and describes his musical style as a fusion of Afrobeats, Hip Hop, Soul, and R&B. His younger brother Tay Iwar cited him as his early musical influence. He cited Childish Gambino, Kendrick Lamar, Anderson Pak, and Fela Kuti, as his musical influence.

== Discography ==
=== Albums ===
List of studio albums, with selected details
Title	Details
199X	Released: 18 June 2021; Label: BANTU; Formats: Digital download, streaming
ULTRALIGHT	Released: 21 April 2023; Label: Outer South; Formats: Digital download, streaming

=== Mixtapes ===
List of mixtapes, with selected details
Title	Details
Jelí	Released: 13 July 2014; Label: BANTU; Formats: Digital download, streaming
Vision	Released: 14 November 2015; Label: BANTU; Formats: Digital download, streaming
Paradise	Released: 16 April 2019; Label: BANTU; Formats: Digital download, streaming

=== Extended plays ===
List of extended plays, with selected details and chart positions
Title	Details
Anecdote	Released: 2014; Label: BANTU; Formats: Digital download, streaming
COLORS	Released: 4 September 2020; Label: BANTU; Formats: Digital download, streaming
the gift	Released: 21 January 2025; Label: Outer South; Formats: Digital download, streaming
