= Soundman Vol. 2 =

Extended play by Wizkid

EP by Wizkid
- Released: 22 December 2023
- Genre: Afrobeats; dancehall; amapiano
- Length: 12:01
- Language: English; Yoruba; Nigerian Pidgin
- Label: RCA; Starboy
- Producer: P.Priime; The Elements; Cake; Bigfish

Wizkid chronology
More Love, Less Ego (2022)	Soundman Vol. 2 (2023)	Morayo (2024)

Soundman Vol. 2 (often shortened to S2) is the second EP by Nigerian singer Wizkid. It was released on 22 December 2023, through RCA Records and Starboy Entertainment, and features guest appearances from Wande Coal and Zlatan. Production was handled by P.Priime, The Elements, Cake, and Bigfish. It serves as a follow-up to More Love, Less Ego (2022), and serves as a sequel to his first EP, Soundman Vol. 1 (2019).

== Background ==
Fellow Nigerian singer Davido announced the release of the EP and expressed his excitement for it via a Twitter post on 19 December 2023 as he announced the release date. Wizkid confirmed its release the same day. He revealed the tracklist for the album on 20 December 2023.

== Critical reception ==
Professional ratings
Review scores
Source	Rating
TheCable	3/5 stars
Pulse Nigeria	7.0/10

Pulse Nigeria's Adeayo Adebiyi said Soundman Vol. 2 was Wizkid's way of having "the final say" in a year he observed afrobeats "from a leisurely distance," describing the EP as offering "the familiar music that started with Soundman Vol. 1," with melodies and flows that were "similar to the style he deploys in his last two projects." He concluded that "nothing in S2 suggests Wizkid intends to vie into a different sonic direction," rating the EP 7.0/10. Friday Omosola of Premium Times called Soundman Vol. 2 "a reflection of Wizkid's artistic growth and influence on the Afrobeats genre," noting that the collaborations "add a rich diversity to the four tracks" and that the production "stands out." He concluded that although "the project is still top-notch" and Wizkid sounds "excellent," it "fails to connect with listeners' souls," with Soundman Vol. 2 serving as "a reminder that staying at the top demands constant creative evolution."

In a review for TheCable, Emmanuel Daraloye said that Soundman Vol. 2 marked Wizkid's return "back to base," saying the EP was "created for the Nigerian audience," carried themes where "love and grief are the dominant emotions," and showed moments where he "gets his groove back" despite uneven delivery. He concluded that it was "the comeback they have all been waiting for" and "a reflection of the brilliance and talent of Wizkid," rating the EP 3/5. Tomide Marv of Zikoko wrote that the EP "takes on amapiano while flexing Wizzy's usual Afrobeats and dancehall sound," noting that "Ololufe" sounded "more in-the-moment than intentional," that "Diamonds" took "a familiar Wizzy approach," and that "IDK" closed the EP as "its best track." He concluded that "overall, S2 is a decent project that offers a good time," adding that "Wizkid likes music, and he’s having fun with it."

== Track listing ==
Soundman Vol. 2 track listing
No.	Title	Writer(s)	Producer(s)	Length
1.	"Ololufe" (featuring Wande Coal)	Ayodeji Balogun; Oluwatobi Ojosipe; Peace Oredope; Olajumoke Olayiwola	P.Priime; Cake	3:30
2.	"Diamonds"	Balogun; Oredope; Nicolas Georgakis	Bigfish; P.Priime	2:29
3.	"Energy"	Balogun; Oredope	P.Priime	3:01
4.	"IDK" (featuring Zlatan)	Balogun; Omoniyi Raphael; Paul Goller; Keven Wolfsohn	TheElements	3:00
Total length:				12:01

== Personnel ==
Credits adapted from Apple Music.

=== Performing artists and composers ===
- Ayodeji "Wizkid" Balogun - vocals, songwriter
- Oluwatobi "Wande Coal" Ojosipe - vocals, songwriter (track 1)
- Omoniyi "Zlatan" Raphael - vocals, songwriter (track 4)
- Damilola Tolulope Ogunleye - lead guitar (track 1, 2)
- Chimamanda "Qing Madi" Chukwuma - background vocals (track 2)
- Oladapo - background vocals (track 2)
- Iniobong Asukwo Edet - bass (track 2)
- Nicolas Georgakis - songwriter (track 2)

=== Production and engineering ===
- Peace "P.Priime" Oredope - producer, songwriter (track 1, 2, 3, 4)
- Olajumoke "Cake" Olayiwola - producer, songwriter (track 1)
- Abayomi "Bigfish" Ilerioluwa - producer (track 2)
- The Elements (Paul Bogumil Goller and Keven Wolfsohn) - producers, songwriters (track 4)
- Sam Harper - engineer (track 1, 2, 3, 4)
- Leandro "Dro" Hidalgo - mixing engineer (track 1, 2, 3)
- Dale Becker - mastering engineer (track 1, 2, 3, 4)
- Aidan Duncan - assistant mixing engineer (track 1, 2, 3)
- Nate Mingo - assistant mastering engineer (track 1, 2, 3, 4)
- Kate Harvey - assistant mastering engineer (track 1, 2, 3, 4)

== Release history ==
Release history and formats for Soundman Vol. 2
Region	Date	Format	Label
Various	22 December 2023	Streaming; digital download	RCA; Starboy
