= Anaïs Cardot =

French-Gabonese singer-songwriter

- Origin: Gabon
- Occupations: Singer, songwriter
- Years active: 2018–present

Anaïs Cardot (French: [anais kaʁdo]) is a French-Gabonese singer-songwriter based in Paris, France. She released her debut EP, Pink Magnolia (2023), featuring tracks "Colors" and "Soldier", which was co-produced by P.priime. In 2024, Anaïs was featured on Wizkid's album Morayo which peaked at number 12 in Apple Music, number 14 on Spotify Top Songs Nigeria as of November 2024.

== Career ==
Her breakthrough came with her debut EP, Pink Magnolia (2023). The EP received acclaim, with airplay in Los Angeles, Paris, and Libreville. Anaïs also had collaborations with Asake on Lungu Boy (2024), contributing vocals to the track "My Heart" and co-writing "Mood".

In 2024, Anaïs was featured on Wizkid's album Morayo, contributing her vocals to the track "Slow". The single debuted at number 16 in the top 100 on Apple Music Nigeria.

== Discography ==
=== Albums and EPs ===
- Pink Magnolia (2023)
- Map of Her Shadow (2026)

=== Singles ===
- Crazy For You (2020)
- Can't Explain (2023)
- Colors (2023)
- Only Heaven (Reimagined) (2024)
- Coraçāo | A COLORS SHOW (2026)
- Second Hand (2026)

== Recognition ==
- Nominated for Best R&B Song at France's Les Flammes Awards (2024)
- Amazon Artist to Watch (2024)
- Native Magazine under Best New Artists
