= DJ Tunez =

Nigerian DJ (born 1989)

- Born: Michael Babatunde Adeyinka; May 10, 1989 (age 37)
- Genres: House, Hip hop, Rap, R&B, Dancehall, Afrobeats
- Occupations: DJ, artist, producer
- Years active: 2014–2026
- Label: Starbboy Entertainment

Michael Babatunde Adeyinka, also known as DJ Tunez, is a Nigerian-American disc jockey. In 2015, DJ Tunez signed to Wizkid's record label Starboy Entertainment. DJ Tunez's first production was in 2016's "Iskaba", a "contagiously upbeat track" featuring Wande Coal. He has collaborated with other acts such as Wizkid, Sarz, Burna Boy, Busiswa, Reekado Banks, Damibliz, Omah Lay, and many more.

== Early life ==
Michael Babatunde Adeyinka was born on May 10, 1989, and raised in South Brooklyn. His dream began after DJing his local church's Christmas parties as a teen. This eventually grew into paid gigs DJing church members' events such as birthday parties and weddings.

His African community in South Brooklyn began to take a fancy to his ability to play music with an afrobeats and dancehall-inspired atmosphere; the attention encouraged him to throw parties around the city.

== Career ==
In 2016, DJ Tunez collaborated with Wande Coal to release 'Iskaba', which was listed in Okayafrica's Best Songs of 2017.

A Black Friday "Blackout" party from DJ Tunez brought about 1,700 people to Queens' Amazura Concert Hall in November 2019.

Featured as a guest panelist at a business forum held at Columbia University in 2019, Adeyinka joined other leaders in the music industry to discuss the business of art and literature on the African continent. The panel was moderated by special guest design and technology executive Olufeko.

In December 2025, DJ Tunez emerged as one of Nigeria’s most streamed DJs on Spotify, amassing over 3.55 million monthly listeners and ranking among Africa’s top DJs, while his collaborative project South Gidi received widespread acclaim across clubs and social media platforms.

== Discography ==
=== Selected singles ===
- "Glow (feat. Iyanya & Khago)" (2014)
- "Your Body (One Dance Refix feat. Wande Coal) " (2016)
- "Cotton Candy (DJ Tunez and Leriq feat. Burna Boy)" (2017)
- "Turn Up (feat. Wizkid & Reekado Banks)" (2018)
- "Oshe (feat. Juls)" (2018)
- "Pepesu (feat. Dotman)" (2018)
- "My Love (feat. Adekunle Gold & Del B)"
- "Get Up (feat. Flash & Sarz)"
- "Iskaba (feat. Wande Coal)"
- "Cover Me (Starboy feat. Wizkid)" (2019)
- "Late Night (feat. Yxng Bane)"
- "Gbese (feat. Wizkid)" (2019)
- "Majesty (feat. Busiswa)" (2019)
- "Hello Esther (feat. Ice Prince)" (2019)
- "Too Much (feat. Flash)"
- "Causing Trouble (feat. Oxlade)" (2019)
- "Paloma (feat. Alpha P. & D3AN Remix)" (2020)
- "Kelegbe Megbe (Remix)" (2020)
- "Enjoyment (feat. Kwamz & Flava)" (2020)
- "Cool Me Down (feat Wizkid)" (2020)
- "Pami (feat Wizkid, Adekunle Gold & Omah Lay)" (2020)
- "One Condition" (feat Wizkid, Fola)" (2025)

== Awards and nominations ==
Year	Awards ceremony	Award description(s)	Recipient	Results	Ref
2014	Nigeria Entertainment Awards	World DJ	Himself	Won	
2017	Nigeria Entertainment Awards	Best Collaboration (Iskaba)	Himself	Won	
2017	Africa Muzik Magazine Awards & Music Festival (AFRIMMA)	Best African DJ (USA)	Himself	Won	
2021	Net Honours	Most Played RnB Song	"Pami" (featuring Wizkid, Adekunle Gold & Omah Lay)	Nominated	
