= Pozer =

British rapper

- Born: Isaiah Sampson; 2001 (age 24–25); Croydon, London, England
- Genre: UK rap
- Occupation: Rapper
- Years active: 2024–present
- Labels: Robots & Humans; RCA

Isaiah Sampson (born 2001), known professionally as Pozer, is a British rapper from Croydon, South London. He gained recognition in 2024 with his debut single, "Kitchen Stove" which peaked at number 22 on the UK Singles Chart.

== Career ==
=== 2018–present: Beginnings and "Kitchen Stove" ===
Pozer's career began in 2018 after freestyles he posted on TikTok started to gain traction as comparisons were made to artists like Nines, Skrapz and Fredo.

Pozer released his debut single "Kitchen Stove" on 23 February 2024. Which quickly gained traction due to its harmonious melody The single reached number 22 on the UK Singles Chart and number 47 on the Irish Singles Chart. Just a week later, on 8 March, the debut hit single received an official remix with Nemzzz and JS x YD. On 19 April 2024 Pozer released his second single, "Malicious Intentions" which peaked at number 41 on the UK Singles Chart and number 97 on the Irish Singles Chart, making Pozer the first UK rapper to chart his first two singles on the UK Singles Chart.

== Musical style ==
One reviewer described his sound as a "bouncy" Jersey club-drill fusion aided by his punchlines "that depict the realities of life on the road and his willingness to progress out of them".

== Discography ==
=== Mixtapes ===
Title	Details
Crossroads	Released: 29 May 2026; Label: Self-released; Format: Digital download

=== Extended plays ===
Title	Details
Against All Odds	Released: 21 February 2025; Label: Robots & Humans Limited, Sony Music; Format: Digital download

=== Singles ===
List of singles as a lead artist, with selected chart positions and certifications, year released, and album name
Title	Year	Peak chart positions					Certifications	Album
Title	Year	UK	UK Indie	UK R&B	IRE	NZ Hot	Certifications	Album
"Kitchen Stove" (solo or with Nemzzz and JS x YD)	2024	22	—	6	47	—	BPI: Silver	Non-album singles
"Next Up" (with JS x YD and Mixtape Madness)	2024	—	—	—	—	—		Non-album singles
"Malicious Intentions"	2024	41	—	11	97	—	BPI: Silver	Non-album singles
"I'm Tryna"	2024	81	—	—	—	—		Non-album singles
"Puppies"	2024	—	—	—	—	—		Non-album singles
"Heaterz" (with AJ Tracey)	2024	— (Note: While it never entered the main UK Singles Chart, "Heaterz" was number 90 for one week on the chart's midweek equivalent, UK Singles Chart Update.)	33	—	—	—		Non-album singles
"Aquatic"	2024	—	—	—	—	—		Non-album singles
"Shanghigh Noon"	2025	—	—	—	—	—		Against All Odds
"Nyash (Shake)"	2025	—	—	—	—	—		Non-album single
"Jersey King"	2025	—	—	—	—	32		Crossroads
"What's Good?" (featuring Kasst 8)	2025	—	—	—	—	—		Non-album single
"Money and Power"	2026	—	—	—	—	—		Crossroads
"Common"	2026	—	—	—	—	—		Crossroads
"Hulk Hogan" (featuring AJ Tracey)	2026	—	—	—	—	—		Crossroads
"MF Doom"	2026	—	—	—	—	—		Crossroads
"Dulux Trade"	2026	—	—	—	—	—		Non-album single
"—" denotes a recording that did not chart or was not released in that territory.
