= Juls =

Ghanaian-British Producer

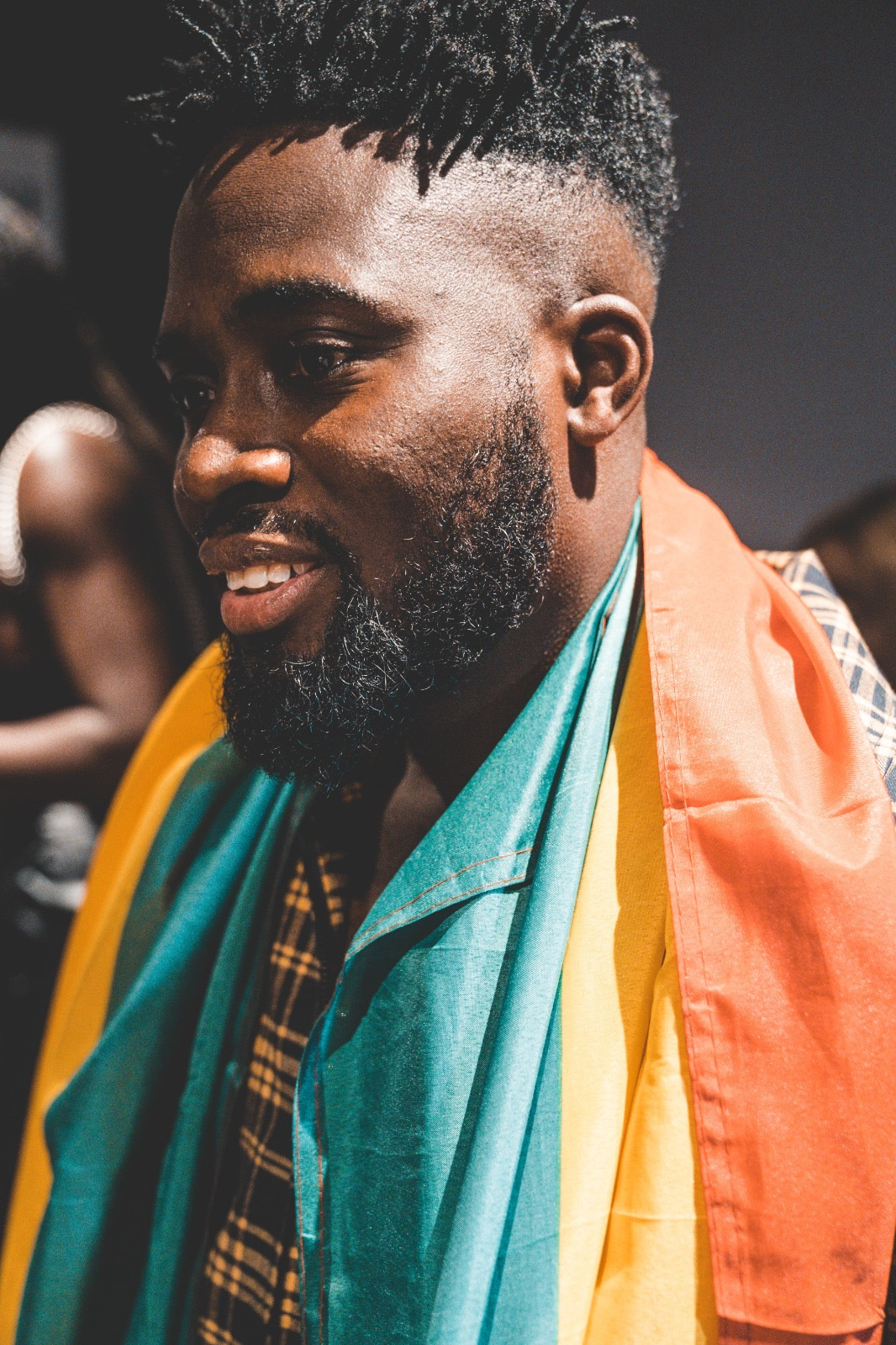
- Juls in 2019

Background information
- Also known as: Juls Baby
- Born: Julian Nii Ayitey Adjin Nicco-Annan
- Genres: Afrobeats, Amapiano, Afrovibes
- Occupations: Record producer, DJ, musician

Julian Nii Ayitey Adjin Nicco-Annan (born 25 October 1985), better known by his stage name Juls, is a British-Ghanaian record producer, disc jockey, and musician. He is known for his music contributions, particularly in Afrobeats circles, and for the production of songs such as: "Bankulize" and "Skin Tight" by Mr Eazi; "Feel Alright" by Show Dem Camp; Rudebwoi Love by Stonebwoy; and Gwarn by Burna Boy. He has collaborated with the label BBnz Live, and has worked on A&R for Mr.Eazi's Life is Eazi album.

== Early life ==
Juls was born in Hackney, East London, to musically inclined parents who moved from Ghana to Britain in the late 1970s. He moved to Hackney, and then to Stevenage in Hertfordshire. He had his education in London, eventually acquiring a bachelor's degree and Master of Finance from the University of Surrey.

== Career ==
In early 2010, Annan began to produce music. He produced "Feel Alright" for Show Dem Camp in 2012 and began to DJ in 2013 while finishing his studies in Surrey. In 2013, Mr. Eazi began to promote shows in Kumasi, Ghana and sent the vocals for one of his songs (“Bankulize”) to Juls. The collaborative track would eventually become a cult hit.

He then began releasing his own music, including "Teef Teef," "With You," and "Give You Love". His debut album entitled Leap of Faith followed in 2017 with Ojekoo, which featured Kojey Radical, Maleek Berry, Nonso Amadi, Eugy, Not3s, and Kojo Funds. These albums both gained over 30 million streams on all major streaming platforms that year.

He produced Wande Coal's "So Mi So", featuring Cruel Santino, in 2019. Following this, he released the Colour project, which featured the likes of Sweetie Irie and Sway Clarke.

“I don’t think there is anything wrong with our content. Look at all the quality videos that our artistes are putting out. Boasting our culture and our identity. The western media isn’t used to this new narrative. As our music scene gets bigger, it’s getting harder to ignore because African Pop music is what is hot right now. Look around you. Our influence is all over everything from film, to music to fashion. Also, I don’t think our aim or my aim anyways is to rub shoulders with “foreign counterparts”. It’s about spreading the culture and our music and getting heard. We haven’t had those resources and access to major funding that’s the only issue. And most African artistes are now getting educated on the business side of things so we don’t get cheated. It takes time. Illiteracy has been Africa’s major problem for developing as a continent. First solution is to take pride in our culture and educate ourselves first.”

In February 2020, Juls traveled to South Africa to experience the culture of Amapiano first hand (a style of house music that emerged in South Africa in mid 2010s), and he began to explore producing the style of music. He then released the 5-track EP Happy Place, which features artists from South Africa, Nigeria, Jamaica and Ghana, including singer-songwriter Busiswa.

Since the release of Happy Place, Juls has released a 2-track collaboration with Sango entitled Fufu & Grits with Soulection, and another new single featuring Randy Valentine titled “Wata”.

Juls produced "U Say" on GoldLink's Diaspora album. He later flew to LA to be appear in the video for the single, which featured Tyler, the Creator and Jay Prince, and was directed by Cruel Santino.

== Tours ==
Juls performed at SXSW in both 2017 and 2018. He also performed at the Encore Festival, The Ends Festival, and TIDAL x Diaspora Calling with Lauryn Hill. In 2019, Juls performed at the Ibiza Meltdown, Afro Republik/Wizkid, and the ADE. His self-curated tour A Night With Juls featured live sets and first premiered in New York in August 2019.

== Discography ==
EPs

- Solora (2014)
- Berlin (2014)
- MS (2014)
- Ojekoo (2017)
- Happy Place (2020)

Albums

- Aamake Sange Nao (2014)
- Finest Club Hits, Vol.8 (2015)
- Finest Club Hits, Vol.9
- Leap of Faith (2017)
- Colour (2019)
- Sounds of My World (2021)
- Peace and Love (2024)

Singles

Year	Title	Album	Ref
2016	Give You Love	Give You Love	
2017	Gwarn feat. Burna Boy		
2017	My Wave	Leap Of Faith	
2018	Sister Girl feat. Wande Coal		
2017	Your Corner feat. Nonso Amadi	Ojekoo	
2017	Oshey feat. Moelogo, Siza, DJ Tunez	Ojekoo	
2019	Maayaa feat. Cruel Santino, Tiggs Da Author	Colour	
2019	kokosa feat Damibliz, zlatan		
2019	Angelina	Colour	
2019	Cake feat. Mr Eazi		
2019	Like Tu Danz feat. Kida Kudz, Ms Banks, Pa Salieu		
2019	Your Number feat. Mugeez, King Promise	Happy Place	
2020	Wishes feat. Jah Cure		
2020	Wata feat. Randy Valentine		
2020	Fufu & Grits feat. Sango	Fufu & Grits	

== Achievements ==
Juls won Producer of the Year at the Ghana Music Awards UK and AFRIMA Awards in 2017. He also was nominated for Best African Act at the Music of Black Origin Awards that year.
