= P2J =

Nigerian-British producer

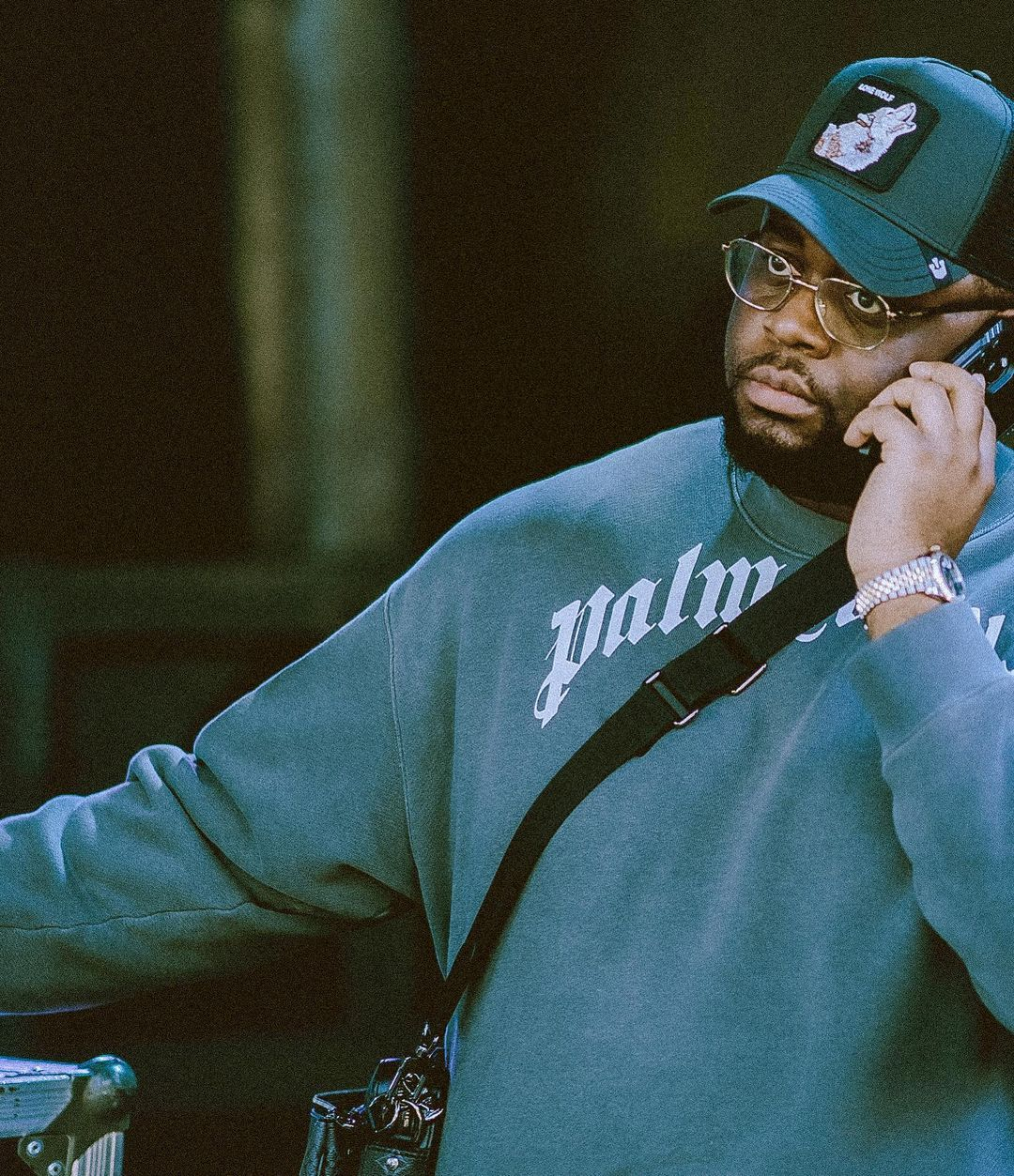
- P2J in 2022

Background information
- Also known as: Pro2Jay
- Born: Richard Olowaranti Mbu Isong; 11 July 1987 (age 39)
- Genres: Afrobeats; pop; R&B; hip hop; afroswing
- Occupations: Record producer; songwriter
- Years active: 2007–present
- Labels: Warner/Chappell Music; BMG

Richard Olowaranti Mbu Isong (born 11 July 1987), known professionally as P2J is a Nigerian-British producer from London, England. He has produced for high-profile pop artists including Beyoncé, Wizkid, Stormzy, FKA Twigs, Burna Boy, Tems, and Doja Cat, among others.

== Career ==
P2J started to solidify his production career at age 14, when an instructor recommended he transfer to music courses. His career kickstarted in 2007 on the television station, Channel U under the name P2J Project with the grime song "Hands in the Air". He formerly produced songs under the name Pro2Jay, for the likes of Tiwa Savage, Krept and Konan and Lily Allen. In 2017, he produced the song "Covered in You" for Chris Brown's album Heartbreak on a Full Moon.

In 2019, he became one of the go-to afrobeats producers, working with artists such as Burna Boy, Wizkid, GoldLink, WSTRN, Doja Cat, Davido and more. His largest collaboration in 2019 was with Beyoncé on the soundtrack album The Lion King: The Gift producing 6 tracks, earning him a Grammy nomination for Best Pop Vocal Album. In 2020, he won his first Grammy award for Best Global Music Album, on Burna Boy's album Twice as Tall. P2J was the primary producer on Wizkid's album Made in Lagos, which was nominated for a Grammy and included the song "Essence". The song became the first Nigerian song in history to chart on the Billboard Hot 100 and the Billboard Global 200 in 2021, and a remix featuring Justin Bieber was later released.

In 2022, he produced for FKA Twigs on the song "Jealousy" from her mixtape Caprisongs. He has also produced 5 songs on Young T & Bugsey's mixtape Truth Be Told and "Fallen Angel" on Ella Mai's album Heart on My Sleeve.

== Artistry ==
P2J spoke on his production style in an interview saying, "Wizkid and I were on the same path in terms of musicality when we met, in terms of merging different genres together, like merging reggae with the Afro, R&B with the Afro. He's been trying to get towards that through Soundman Vol. 1. We just eased into it with Made in Lagos. If you listen to the album, there's like a specific bass line that I've done that's quite memorable." He also said that his goal to "infuse African music in anything I do. Whether it's African music like afro and R&B, afro and house, afro and pop, or afro and rap. I've always tried to infuse it in any way."

== Production discography ==
=== 2013 ===
Nathan – Dark Room – single

- 00. "Dark Room"

=== 2015 ===
Krept and Konan – The Long Way Home

- 07. "I Don't Know" (featuring Rebecca Garton) (produced with Crumz)
- 17. "So Easy" (produced with Big Mike)

Tiwa Savage – R.E.D

- 08. "Love Me Hard" (featuring 2face Idibia)
- 17. "Bad" (featuring Wizkid)

=== 2017 ===
Stormzy – Gang Signs & Prayer

- 02. "Bad Boys" (featuring Ghetts & J Hus) (produced with Fraser T. Smith, EY & Stormzy)

Tiwa Savage – Sugarcane

- 02. "Get It Now"
- 04. "Hold Me Down"

Star.One – Okay (P2J Remix) – Single

- 00. Okay (P2J Remix) (featuring Maleek Berry & Seyi Shay)

Gyyps – Killafornia

- 08. "Workout"

Yungen – All Night – Single

- 00. "All Night" (featuring Mr Eazi)

Reblah – Back to Glory

- 04. "Wabamilo" (featuring P2J)

Chris Brown – Heartbreak on a Full Moon

- 07. "Covered in You" (produced with Ayo & Keyz)

=== 2018 ===
Burna Boy – Outside

- 03. "Koni Baje"
- 11. "Devil in California"

Lily Allen – No Shame

- 04. "Your Choice" (featuring Burna Boy)
- 08. "Higher"

Rebecca Garton – The Intent 2: The Come Up (soundtrack)

- 18. "Always"

Mario – Dancing Shadows

- 04. "Mirror" (produced with Mario & Jake Gosling)

=== 2019 ===
KSI and Randolph – New Age

- 09. "Pull Up" (KSI featuring Jme) (produced with Sammy SoSo)

GoldLink – Diaspora

- 01. "//error" (produced with Ari PenSmith & GoldLink)
- 02. "Joke Ting" (featuring Ari PenSmith) (produced with Ari PenSmith)
- 03. "Maniac" (produced with OBR)
- 05. "Zulu Screams" (featuring Maleek Berry and Bibi Bourelly)
- 06. "More" (featuring Lola Rae)
- 07. "Cokewhite" (featuring Pusha T) (produced with Fwdslxsh, McKenzie, MD$ & Momberger)
- 09. "Yard" (featuring Haile of WSTRN)
- 10. "Spanish Song" (featuring WaveIQ)
- 11. "No Lie" (featuring WizKid) (produced with Ari PenSmith & Deats)

Beyoncé – The Lion King: The Gift

- 06. "Don't Jealous Me" (Tekno, Lord Afrixana, Yemi Alade and Mr Eazi) (produced with Beyoncé & Dixie)
- 08. "Ja Ara E" (Burna Boy) (produced with Beyoncé & Dixie)
- 14. "Water" (Salatiel, Pharrell and Beyoncé) (produced with Beyoncé)
- 15. "Brown Skin Girl" (Beyoncé, Saint Jhn and Wizkid featuring Blue Ivy Carter) (produced with Beyoncé & Dixie)
- 17. "Keys to the Kingdom" (Tiwa Savage and Mr Eazi) (produced with Beyoncé, Northboi Oracle, GuiltyBeatz & Dixie)
- 25. "Scar" (070 Shake and Jessie Reyez) (produced with Beyoncé, Tim Suby, Hamelin, Ari PenSmith, Dixie & Mike Dean)

Burna Boy – African Giant

- 02. "Anybody"

Mark Ronson – Don't Leave Me Lonely (featuring Yebba)

- 01. "Don't Leave Me Lonely" (featuring Yebba)

WSTRN – WSTRN Season, Vol. 2

- 14. "Switch It Up" (produced with AoD & PRGRSHN)

Snoh Aalegra – Situationship – Single

- 00. "Situationship"

Odunsi (The Engine) – Better Days / Wetin Dey – Single

- 00. "Better Days" (featuring Wani)

Justine Skye – Bare With Me

- 02. "Secrets"
- 03. "Bulletproof"
- 05. "When You're Ready"

Wretch 32 – 10/10 – Single

- 00. "10/10" (featuring Giggs)

Krept and Konan – G Love – Single

- 00. "G Love" (featuring Wizkid)

Doja Cat – Hot Pink

- 08. "Addiction" (produced with Ari PenSmith)

Jaz Karis – Summer Stories

- 03. "Bad Memories"
- 03. "Come Around"
- 04. "Owe You"
- 06. "Unwritten Rules"

Davido – A Good Time

- 07. "Get to You"

Skylar Stecker – Redemption

- 03. Sleep On"

=== 2020 ===
Starboy – Soundman Vol. 1

- 01. "Jam" (Wizkid featuring Chronixx)

Skip Marley – Slow Down (P2J Remix) – Single

- 00. "Slow Down (P2J Remix)" (featuring H.E.R.)

Manny Norté – 4AM – Single

- 00. "4AM" (with 6lack, Rema & Tion Wayne)

Lilah – Atlantis

- 01. "Atlantis"
- 03. "Summer Nights Fling"
- 04. "Oxymoron"
- 05. "Tired"
- 06. "Euphoria"
- 07. "Lilah's Lullaby"

Wretch 32 – Upon Reflection

- 04. "10/10" (featuring Giggs)
- 05. "Burn" (featuring Ghetts & Talay Riley)

Young T & Bugsey – Plead the 5th

- 06. "Stand Up Man"

Haley Cassidy – Stripped

- 03. "Beyond the Sun"
- 04. "Foolish"
- 07. "Life After You"
- 09. "So Gone (Interlude)"
- 10. "Still Stay" (featuring Tiggs Da Author)
- 11. "Why Didn't You Call?"

Aminé – Limbo

- 10. "Easy" (featuring Summer Walker)

Burna Boy – Twice as Tall

- 02. "Alarm Clock" (produced with Diddy & Timbaland)

Tiwa Savage – Celia

- 08. "Us (Interlude)"

Alicia Keys – Alicia

- 04. "Wasted Energy" (featuring Diamond Platnumz)

Gorillaz – Song Machine, Season One: Strange Timez

- 07. "Aries" (featuring Peter Hook and Georgia)
- 12. "Opium" (featuring EarthGang)

Wizkid – Made in Lagos

- 01. "Reckless"
- 02. "Ginger" (featuring Burna Boy) (produced with Kel-P)
- 03. "Longtime" (featuring Skepta) (produced with Sarz)
- 04. "Mighty Wine"
- 05. "Blessed" (featuring Damian Marley)
- 06. "Smile" (featuring H.E.R.)
- 07. "Piece of Me" (featuring Ella Mai)
- 08. "No Stress"
- 10. "Sweet One"
- 11. "Essence" (featuring Tems) (produced with Legendury Beatz)
- 14. "Grace"
- 16. "Mood" (featuring Buju)
- 17. "Steady"
- 18. "Essence (Remix)" (featuring Justin Bieber & Tems)

Griff – Say It Again – Single

- 01. "Say It Again"

Jessie Reyez – Before Love Came To Kill Us

- 09. "ROOF"

Angel – Blessings (Remix)

- 01. "Blessings Remix" (featuring French Montana & Davido)

=== 2021 ===
Dave – Titanium & Mercury – Single

- 01. "Titanium"

Sinéad Harnett – Ready Is Always Too Late

- 05. "Anymore" (featuring Lucky Daye)

Snoh Aalegra – Temporary Highs in the Violet Skies

- 14. "Dying 4 Your Love" (produced with Marco Bernadis, Malik Venner & Jack Nichols-Marcy)

Dave – We're All Alone in This Together

- 06. "System" (featuring Wizkid) (produced with Kyle Evans, Jae5 & Joe Reeves)
- 07. "Lazarus" (featuring Boj) (produced with Jae5 & Joe Reeves)
- 10. "Twenty to One" (produced with Dave & Kyle Evans)

Not3s – 3 Th3 Album

- 08. "Counting"

WSTRN – Wonder Woman – Single

- 00. "Wonder Woman"

Tion Wayne – Green with Envy

- 07. "West End" (featuring D-Block Europe)
- 12. "Realest One"
- 13. "Spend a Bag" (featuring 6lack)
- 15. "Homecoming"

Tamera – Afrodite

- 01. "Wickedest"
- 02. "New Hobby"
- 03. "Strong For Me"
- 04. "Angel Dust"
- 05. "Good Love" (featuring Tay Iwar)

Pa Salieu – Afrikan Rebel

- 01. "Shining" (featuring Tay Iwar & Zlatan)

Burna Boy – B.D'or featuring Wizkid – Single

- 01. "B.D'or" (featuring Wizkid)

Zhavia Ward – Big Girl$ Don't Cry – Single

- 01. "Big Girl$ Don't Cry"

=== 2022 ===
FKA Twigs – Caprisongs

- 11. "Jealousy" (featuring Rema) (produced with Fred Again, El Guincho, FKA Twigs & Koreless)

Young T & Bugsey – Truth Be Told

- 02. "Big Bidness"
- 04. "Caliente" (featuring Aitch)
- 09. "Nice" (featuring Blxst)
- 10. "Roberto C" (featuring Unknown T)
- 11. "Glitter Ain't Gold"

Ella Mai – Heart on My Sleeve

- "Fallen Angel" (produced with Meko yohannes, Jahaan Sweet, Gaetan Judd, Mustard & Ari PenSmith)

Burna Boy – Love, Damini

- 02. "Science"
- 06. "Whiskey"
- 10. "Dirty Secrets"
- 12. "For My Hand" (featuring Ed Sheeran)

Omah Lay – Boy Alone

- 02. "i"
- 13. "tell everybody" (featuring Tay Iwar)

Beyoncé – Renaissance

- 10. "Move" (produced with Beyoncé, GuiltyBeatz, MeLo-X, The-Dream & Stuart White)

Aitch – Close to Home

- 09. "Cheque"

Santigold – Spirituals

- 08. "No Paradise"

CKay – Sad Romance

- 02. "Mmadu" (produced with Ckay)

M.I.A. – MATA

- 02. "Zoo Girl" (produced with Ckay)

A Boogie wit da Hoodie – Me vs. Myself

- 03. "Take Shots" (featuring Tory Lanez)

Wizkid – More Love, Less Ego

- 01. "Money & Love"
- 03. "Bad to Me"
- 04. "2 Sugar" (featuring Ayra Starr)
- 05. "Everyday"
- 06. "Slip n Slide" (featuring Skillibeng & Shenseea)
- 07. "Deep"
- 08. "Flower Pads"
- 09. "Wow" (featuring Skepta & Naira Marley)
- 11. "Plenty Loving"
- 13. "Frames (Who's Gonna Know)"

Stormzy – This Is What I Mean

- 02. "This Is What I Mean" (featuring Black Sherif, Amaarae & Ms Banks)
- 05. "Need You" (featuring tendai & Ayra Starr)
- 06. "Hide & Seek"
- 10. "Bad Blood" (featuring NAO)
- 11. "I Got My Smile Back" (featuring India.Arie)

=== 2023 ===
Kali Uchis – Red Moon in Venus

- 06. "Fantasy"

Chlöe – In Pieces

- 04. "I Don't Mind"

Jorja Smith – falling or flying

- 03. "Little Things"

Tay Iwar – Summer Breeze

- 06. "Don't Lie"

Masego – Masego

- 10. "Say You Want Me" (produced with E.Y. & Dan Foster)

J Hus – Beautiful and Brutal Yard

- 02. "Massacre"
- 03. "Who Told You" (featuring Drake)
- 04. "Militerian" (featuring Naira Marley)
- 19. "Playing Chess"

Lil Tjay – 222

- 01. "Nightshift"

Tori Kelly – Tori

- 04. "Unbelievable" (featuring Ayra Starr)

=== 2024 ===
Kali Uchis – ORQUÍDEAS

- 02. "Me Pongo Loca"
- 05. "Diosa"
- 07. "Perdiste"

Tyla – TYLA

- 11. "On My Body" (with Becky G)

Ayra Starr – The Year I Turned 21

- 2. Goodbye (Warm Up" (with Asake)

Victony – Stubborn

- 3. Ludo (with Shallipopi)
- 4. Anita
- 15. Sunday School

Wizkid – Morayo

- 1. Troubled Mind
- 2. Karamo
- 3. Kese (Dance)
- 5. Time
- 6. Piece of My Heart (featuring Brent Faiyaz)
- 7. Break Me Down
- 8. Bend
- 9. A Million Blessings
- 10. Après Minuit (featuring Tiakola)
- 11. Bad for You (featuring Jazmine Sullivan)
- 12. Soji
- 13. Don't Care
- 14. Slow (featuring Anaïs Cardot)
- 15. Lose
- 16. Pray

=== 2025 ===
Lisa (rapper) – Alter Ego

- 08. "When I'm With You" (with Tyla)

J Hus

- "Gold" (featuring Asake)

Odeal – The Summer that Saved Me

- 06. "Patience"

Burna Boy – No Sign of Weakness

- 01. "No Panic"

J Balvin

- "Uuu" - (with Stormzy)

Burna Boy – Everything Is a Lot

- 13. "City on Fire" - Odeal

Odeal – The Fall that Saved Us

- 09. "Nights in The Sun" - (with Wizkid)

Ed Sheeran – Play – Deluxe edition

- 18. "Skeletons"

Sasha Keable – Act Right

- "TAI CHI"

Tyla

- "Chanel"

=== 2026 ===
Sasha Keable – Act II

- "Heal Something"

== Awards and nominations ==
Year	Event	Prize	Recipient	Result	Ref
2019	Soul Train Music Award for The Ashford & Simpson Songwriter's Award	Record of the Year	Brown Skin Girl – Beyoncé ft. Wizkid & Saint Jhn	Won	
2020	Grammy Awards	Best Pop Vocal Album	The Lion King: The Gift	Nominated	
2021	Grammy Awards	Best Global Music Album	Twice as Tall	Won	
2021	Soul Train Music Award for The Ashford & Simpson Songwriter's Award	Record of the Year	Essence (song) – Wizkid ft. Tems	Nominated	
2021	Rated Awards	Producer of the Year	Himself	Nominated	
2022	Grammy Awards	Best Global Music Album	Made in Lagos	Nominated	
2022	Grammy Awards	Best Global Music Performance	"Essence" (featuring Tems)	Nominated	
2023	A&R Awards	Producer Of The Year	Himself	Nominated	
