= Tay Iwar =

Nigerian record producer (born 1997)

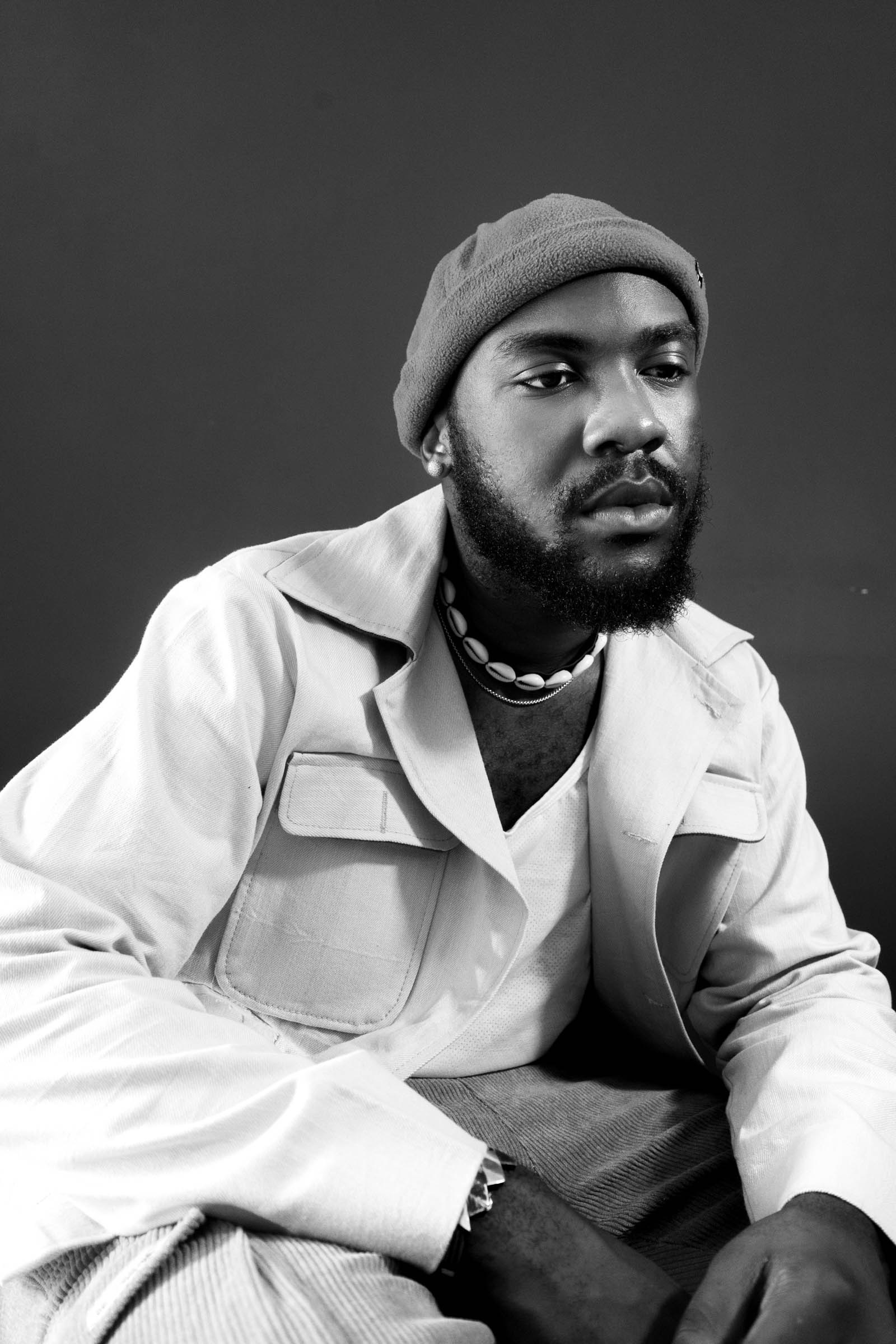
- Born: Austin Iornongu Iwar; 9 June 1997 (age 28); Marina, Lagos Island, Nigeria
- Occupations: singer; songwriter; composer; sound engineer; record producer
- Relatives: Suté Iwar (Brother); Terna Iwar (Brother)
- Musical career
- Origin: Benue State, Nigeria
- Genres: Alté; R&B; neo soul
- Instruments: Guitar, piano
- Years active: 2013–present
- Labels: BANTU; Soulection; CoolSweat
- Member of: BANTU Collective
- Website: www.tayiwar.com

Austin Iornongu Iwar Jnr (born 9 June 1997), known professionally as Tay Iwar, is a Nigerian singer-songwriter, composer, sound engineer and record producer known for his vibrant blend of R&B and Afro-fusion, drawing upon classic Afrobeat, hip-hop, and future sounds. Tay Iwar's career can often feel longer than it's been. He was only in his teens when he released his first full-length projects, including 2016's Renascentia. He then rose to wider fame with 2019's Gemini, released with LA-based music collective Soulection.

He came into the music scene with a critically acclaimed mixtape album Passport, which earned him a nomination at the 3rd and 4th editions of Nigerian Teens Choice Awards in the Choice Mixtape/EP category in 2014 and 2015. On 23 November 2021, "Wizkid’s Made in Lagos deluxe studio album, was nominated at the GRAMMYs and earned him, a special recognition from The Recording Academy".

== Early life ==
Austin Iornongu Iwar was born on 9 June 1997 in Marina, and raised between Lagos and Abuja. His early influence in music, came from his elder brother Suté Iwar. Austin began creating music at age fourteen, using the digital music software FL Studio.

== Career ==
On April 22, 2016, Tay Iwar released a seven-track EP titled Renascentia, featuring Suté Iwar. The EP included the track "Equestrian Love," which was later featured on the soundtrack of the third season of Skinny Girl in Transit in 2017. Following the premiere of the series, the song gained popularity after being shared by artist M.I. On April 29, 2017, Iwar opened for Aṣa at the Encore "Live In Lagos" Concert held at the Eko Convention Center in Lagos.

In 2019, Iwar released his studio album GEMINI, which includes guest appearances from Cruel Santino, Preyé, Odunsi (The Engine), and Suté Iwar. The track "Utero" earned Iwar a nomination for Best Vocal Performance (Male) at the 14th edition of The Headies. On April 13, 2019, his songs "Diamond" and "Keeps" from GEMINI were featured on Soulection radio.

In 2020, Iwar collaborated with Wizkid on the track "True Love," alongside Projexx, which later earned him his first Grammy nomination. He also featured on Omah Lay's Boy Alone album in 2022. On March 29, 2022, Wizkid released the music video for "True Love," featuring both Tay Iwar and Projexx.

In 2022, Iwar was nominated for "Artist of the Year" (Rest of Africa) at the South Africa Music Awards for his EP Love and Isolation. He contributed to Wizkid's Made in Lagos: Deluxe Edition (2020) with songwriting credits for "True Love" and "Steady," and he worked on More Love, Less Ego (2022) with songwriting credits for "Deep" and "Frames." He also co-produced Burna Boy's "Alone," featured on the Black Panther: Wakanda Forever soundtrack album (2022), and contributed to Dave's track "System" with Wizkid, which peaked at number one on the Official Afrobeat Chart. In late 2023, Iwar received two Grammy nominations for his work on the Black Panther: Wakanda Forever soundtrack.

On June 17, 2022, Iwar released the single "Bad4u," followed by a music video on June 19, 2022. In 2023, he released "Healing," the lead single from his EP Summer Breeze, with its music video premiering on March 3, 2023. On May 11, 2023, he released "Undercover Lover," the second single from Summer Breeze. On June 8, 2023, he released. featuring Juls, which was subsequently followed by the official release of Summer Breeze on June 9, 2023, through CoolSweat. The EP features collaborations with Juls, Twelve XII, IDK, Knucks, and Kojey Radical.

In 2024, Tay Iwar featured on Headie One's The Last One album on the track "Guns & Money". He also released the second installment of his GOLD EP with Le Mav on July 12, 2024.

== Discography ==
=== Mixtapes ===
List of mixtapes with selected details
| Title | Mixtape details |
|---|---|
| Passport | Released: 20 April 2014; Label: BANTU; Formats: Digital download, streaming |

=== Studio albums ===
List of studio albums with selected details
| Title | Album details |
|---|---|
| GEMINI | Released: 29 March 2019; Label: Soulection; Formats: Digital download, streaming |

=== EPs ===
List of extended plays with selected details
| Title | EP details |
|---|---|
| Renascentia | Released: 22 April 2016; Label: Bantu; Formats: Digital download, streaming |
| 1997 | Released: 26 August 2018; Label: Soulection; Formats: Digital download, streaming |
| GOLD with Le Mav | Release date: 13 December 2019; Label: GOLD; Formats: Digital download, streaming |
| Love & Isolation | Released: 16 April 2021; Label: Jungle/Bantu; Formats: Digital download, streaming |
| Summer Breeze | Released: 9 June 2023; Label: CoolSweat, Believe UK; Formats: Digital download, streaming |
| Gold II with Le Mav | Released: 12th July 2024; Label: CoolSweat, Believe UK; Formats: Digital download, streaming |

=== Other charted songs ===
List of charted songs, with selected chart positions
| Title | Year | Peak chart positions | Album | Sales | Certifications |
| Title | Year | US Afrobeats | Album | Sales | Certifications |
|---|---|---|---|---|---|
| "True Love" (Wizkid featuring Tay Iwar & Projexx) | 2020 | 46 | Made in Lagos | US: 100,000 (as of March 2022) | RISA: Platinum |

== Accolades ==
| Year | Event | Prize | Recipient | Result |
|---|---|---|---|---|
| 2014 | Nigerian Teens Choice Awards | Choice Mixtape/EP | Passport | Nominated |
| 2015 | Nigerian Teens Choice Awards | Choice Mixtape/EP | Passport | Nominated |
| 2020 | The Headies | Best Vocal Performance (Male) | Tay Iwar for "Utero" | Nominated |
| 2022 | Grammy Awards | Special Recognition | Tay Iwar for (Made in Lagos (Deluxe) by Wizkid) | Nominated |
| 2022 | The Headies | Best Vocal Performance (Male) | Tay Iwar for "Peaking" | Nominated |
| 2022 | South African Music Awards | Rest of Africa Artist | Tay Iwar for Love and Isolation | Nominated |
| 2024 | TurnTable Music Awards | Outstanding Achievement in Songwriting in Music | Himself | Won |
