= TurnTable Top 100 Songs =

Nigerian songs chart

Nigeria Official Top 100 Songs
- Formation: 3 July 2020; 5 years ago
- Purpose: To award trending top songs
- Services: record chart
- Owner: TurnTable
- Website: top100

The TurnTable Top 100 Songs (also known as Nigeria Official Top 100 Songs) is the music industry standard record chart in Nigeria for songs, published weekly by TurnTable magazine. Chart rankings are based on airplay (radio and tv) and online streaming in Nigeria. In its opening year, TurnTable charts listed 50 positions, but later expanded its chart ranking to 100 on the second half of 2022.

The first issue of the Top 100, was launched on Monday, 11 July 2022, and was led by Asake "Peace Be Unto You (PBUY)".

== History ==
The weekly chart was launched on 13 July 2020, as TurnTable Top 50. The chart is also a component of the End of the Year Top 50, with data from Audiomack, Boomplay Music, and YouTube. The first issue of the Top 50 chart was launched on Monday, 9 November 2020, and was led by Wizkid "Ginger". The chart was compiled by TurnTable on Wednesdays, and published on Mondays. In July 2022, following the launch of the Top 100, it began tracking records from Friday to Thursday; the tracking week begins on Friday (to coincide with Global New Music Friday) and ends on Thursday. The tracking period also applies to airplay and streaming.

On 31 March 2022, TurnTable announce the expansion of the Top 50 and incorporated the streaming data from Apple Music, Deezer, and Spotify into the Top 50. TurnTable partnership with Apple Music, Deezer, and Spotify, will also be added into the soon-to-be Top 100. On 11 July 2022, TurnTable premiered the Top 100. The chart eventually became the one main all-genre singles chart, following the launch of the seven genre component of the TurnTable Nigerian Top 100; which include:

- Top Afro-Pop Songs: a multi-metric weekly ranking of the 25 most popular Afro-Pop songs in the country.
- Top Afro-R&B Songs: a weekly ranking of the 25 most popular Afro-R&B songs in the country.
- Top Street-POP Songs: a weekly ranking of the 25 most popular Street-POP songs in the country.
- Top Hip-Hop/Rap Songs: a weekly ranking of the 25 most popular Hip-Hop songs in the country.
- Top Gospel Songs: a weekly ranking of the 20 most popular Gospel songs in the country.
- Top Alternative Songs: a weekly ranking of the 20 most popular songs that do not contain elements associated with the mainstream.
- Top Traditional Songs: a weekly ranking of the 20 most popular songs containing elements such as Fuji, Juju, Highlife, Egedege, Arewa Pop, and more.
- Top African Dance/EDM Songs: a weekly ranking of the biggest dance and electronic songs containing African elements such as Amapiano, Dance and more sub-genres.

The seven genre components of the chart, are important, in the ranking of the best song performance in sales, streaming, and airplay. The chart data for airplay are provided by Radiomonitor for both television and radio. The chart data for online streaming, are provided by Audiomack, Boomplay Music, YouTube, Apple Music, Deezer, and Spotify. The seven genre components are accumulated, before being included in the TurnTable Nigeria Top 100. TurnTable other charts component for the Top 100 also include:

- Top International Songs: a weekly ranking of the 25 most popular songs released by non-Nigerians in the country.
- Bubbling Under Top 100: a weekly ranking of the top 25 songs below the Nigeria Top 100 that have previously never appeared on the Top 100.
- NXT Emerging Top Songs: a weekly ranking of the 20 most popular songs released by emerging artistes in the country.

== Compilation ==
The tracking week for the two components (airplay and streaming) of TurnTable Nigeria Top 100, begins on Friday (to tally with the Global New Music Friday) and ends on Thursday. The first issue of the Top 100 chart is dated 11 July 2022, which represents the chart week of 1–7 July, which began effectively. A new chart is compiled and officially released to the public by TurnTable on Monday, 6pm WAT. For example:

- Friday, 1 July 2022 – tracking week for airplay and streaming begins
- Thursday, 7 July 2022 – tracking week for airplay and streaming ends
- Monday, 11 July 2022 – new chart released with the issue dated 11 July

== Policy ==
On 6 July 2022, TurnTable finalized weighting changes to streaming and airplay components of music activity in Nigeria that will make up its new flagship chart, TurnTable Top 100. The proposed TurnTable Nigeria Top 100 will comprise two major components; streaming and airplay. Under the new system, TurnTable Charts’ streaming classification model will weigh paid subscription services higher than ad-supported services. This means that the Top 100 will be calculated based on paid subscription streams, in which streaming will account for 50% of the chart, airplay will account for the other 50% of the chart. Paid streams will be weighted as one point (1.0) per play value, freemium streams will be weighted as 0.75 points per play, and ad-supported video streams from YouTube will be weighted 0.66 points per play, while ad-supported streams will be weighted 0.5 points per play.

=== Remixes ===
The original and remix versions will be combined for a singular chart entry, and the version with the highest percentage of total streaming & airplay will be credited. However, in a case where the structure, lyrics, and melody of a song are changed for the remix, it will count as a new chart entry and registered as “Pt 2” on the chart.

=== Album cuts ===
Album cuts are eligible to chart on the Nigeria Top 100 provided they pass all the requirements.

=== Bundling ===
TurnTable Charts will account for bundling on a case-by-case basis.

=== Recurrent ===
A song enters the recurrent status if it has spent 25 weeks on the Nigeria Top 100 and fallen below No. 50 – and if it has spent 52 weeks on the chart and falls below No. 25. The aim of this policy is to allow the chart remain as current as possible and prevent holdover from major artistes and international artistes signed to major labels.

=== Tracking week ===
The tracking week for all the platforms tracked by TurnTable coincides with the global release date, i.e. Friday to Thursday, a seven-day tracking week. This applies to the Top 100.
