= Fireboy DML discography =

- Studio albums: 4
- EPs: 1
- Singles: 18
- Music videos: 15

The discography of Nigerian singer and songwriter Fireboy DML includes 4 studio albums, 1 EP, 26 singles (4 as lead artist) with 1 guest appearance and 29 music videos.

== Albums ==
=== Studio albums ===
List of albums, with selected chart positions
Title	Album details	Peak chart positions	
Title	Album details	NGR	US
Laughter, Tears and Goosebumps	Released: 29 November 2019; Label: YBNL Nation; Formats: CD, LP, digital download, streaming	39	—
Apollo	Released: 20 August 2020; Label: YBNL Nation/Empire; Formats: CD, LP, digital download, streaming	39	—
Playboy	Released: 5 August 2022; Label: YBNL Nation/Empire; Formats: CD, LP, vinyl, digital download, streaming	8	123
Adedamola	Released: 29 August 2024; Label: YBNL Nation/Empire; Formats: CD, LP, vinyl, digital download, streaming	2	—
"—" denotes a recording that did not chart or was not released in that territory.

== EPs ==
Title	EP details
Outside / Obaa Sima	Released: 7 December 2023; Label: YBNL Nation/Empire; Formats: Digital download

== Singles ==
=== As lead artist ===
List of singles, with selected chart positions
Title	Year	Peak chart positions										Certifications	Album
Title	Year	NGR	CAN	FRA	IRE	NLD	SWI	UK	US	US Afro	WW	Certifications	Album
"Jealous"	2018	—	—	—	—	—	—	—	—	—	—		Laughter, Tears and Goosebumps
"What If I Say"	2019	—	—	—	—	—	—	—	—	—	—		Laughter, Tears and Goosebumps
"King"	2019	—	—	—	—	—	—	—	—	—	—		Laughter, Tears and Goosebumps
"New York City Girl"	2020	—	—	—	—	—	—	—	—	—	—		Apollo
"Eli"	2020	—	—	—	—	—	—	—	—	—	—		Apollo
"Tattoo"	2020	—	—	—	—	—	—	—	—	—	—		Apollo
"Champion" (with D Smoke)	2020	—	—	—	—	—	—	—	—	—	—		Apollo
"Peru" (solo, with Ed Sheeran, or with 21 Savage and Blxst)	2021	21	37	40	7	1	31	2	53	1	34	BPI: 3× Platinum; IFPI Danmark: Gold; RMNZ: Platinum; RIAA: Gold; SNEP: Diamond; TCSN: 3× Platinum	Playboy
"Beauty & the Madness" (with Rexx Life Raj and Wale)	2022	—	—	—	—	—	—	—	—	—	—		Non-album single
"Playboy"	2022	—	—	—	—	—	—	—	—	8	—	TCSN: Platinum	Playboy
"Bandana" (with Asake)	2022	—	—	—	—	—	—	—	—	—	—	BPI: Silver; TCSN: 5× Platinum	Playboy
"Someone"	2023	—	—	—	—	—	—	—	—	40	—		Non-album single
"Yawa"	2023	—	—	—	—	—	—	—	—	36	—		Adedamola
"Oh My"	2023	—	—	—	—	—	—	—	—	19	—		Non-album single
"Outside" (featuring Blaqbonez)	2023	—	—	—	—	—	—	—	—	23	—		Outside / Obaa Sima
"Obaa Sima"	2023	—	—	—	—	—	—	—	—	—	—		Adedamola
"Everyday"	2024	—	—	—	—	—	—	—	—	14	—	TCSN: Gold	Adedamola
"Olufunmi Reimagined" (with ID Cabasa, Odumodublvck, BOJ, and Joeboy)	2024	—	—	—	—	—	—	—	—	—	—		
"Heavy Heart" (with Loco Dice and Skrillex)	2024	—	—	—	—	—	—	—	—	—	—		TBA
"Story" (with Take a Daytrip)	2025	—	—	—	—	—	—	—	—	—	—		Non-album singles
"Dopamine"	2025	27	—	—	—	—	—	—	—	21	—		Non-album singles
"Body" (with Topic and Nico Santos)	2025	—	—	—	—	—	—	—	—	—	—		Non-album singles
"—" denotes a recording that did not chart or was not released in that territory.

=== As featured artist ===
List of singles, with selected chart positions
Title	Year	Peak chart positions	Album
Title	Year	US Dance	Album
"Running" (Ladipoe featuring Fireboy DML)	2021	—	Providence
"Frozen (Fireboy DML remix)" (Madonna vs Sickick featuring Fireboy DML)	2022	12	Non-album singles
"Me and My Guitar" (Jax Jones featuring Fireboy DML)	2023	—	Non-album singles
"Drink Water" (Jon Batiste featuring Jon Bellion and Fireboy DML)	2023	—	Non-album singles

== Guest appearances ==
List of guest appearances
Title	Year	Album
"Liar" (Justin Timberlake featuring Fireboy DML)	2024	Everything I Thought It Was
"Time Is Money" (Joyner Lucas featuring Fireboy DML, DaBaby and J Balvin)	2025	ADHD 2

== Music videos ==
=== As lead artist ===
List of music videos as lead artist, showing date released and directors
Title	Video release date	Director(s)	Ref.
"Jealous"	25 March 2019	Director K	
"What If I Say"	14 June 2019	TG Omori	
"King"	16 September 2019	TG Omori	
"Scatter"	28 November 2019	Clarence Peters	
"Need You"	14 January 2020	Clarence Peters	
"Vibration"	10 February 2020	TG Omori	
"New York City Girl"	22 June 2020	Clarence Peters	
"Eli"	31 July 2020	Clarence Peters	
"Tattoo"	12 August 2020	Clarence Peters	
"Friday Feeling"	18 September 2020	Director K	
"Spell" (featuring Wande Coal)	17 December 2020	Clarence Peters	
"Champion" (featuring D Smoke)	4 March 2021	TG Omori	
"Lifestyle"	19 May 2021	Clarence Peters	
"Airplane Mode"	9 June 2021	Clarence Peters	
"Peru"	8 August 2021	Mariano Valentino	
"Peru" (with Ed Sheeran)	24 December 2021	Gabriella Kingsley	
"Playboy"	25 May 2022	TG Omori	
"Bandana" (with Asake)	17 August 2022	TG Omori	
"All of Us (Ashawo)"	28 October 2022	Clarence Peters	
"Someone"	5 May 2023	Bruno Marin	
"Yawa"	22 June 2023	Blank Square Production	
"Oh My"	8 November 2023	Jyde Ajala	
"Outside" (featuring Blaqbonez)	8 December 2023	Jyde Ajala	
"Obaa Sima"	15 January 2024	Jyde Ajala	
"Everyday"	5 June 2024	TG Omori	
"Back n Forth" (featuring Lagbaja)	3 September 2024	Clarence Peters	
"Iseoluwa"	3 December 2024	Olu The Wave	
"Ecstasy" (featuring Seun Kuti)	13 January 2025	Olu The Wave	
"Hell and Back"	6 March 2025	A Strange Picture	
