= Femi Dapson =

Nigerian music video producer and filmmaker

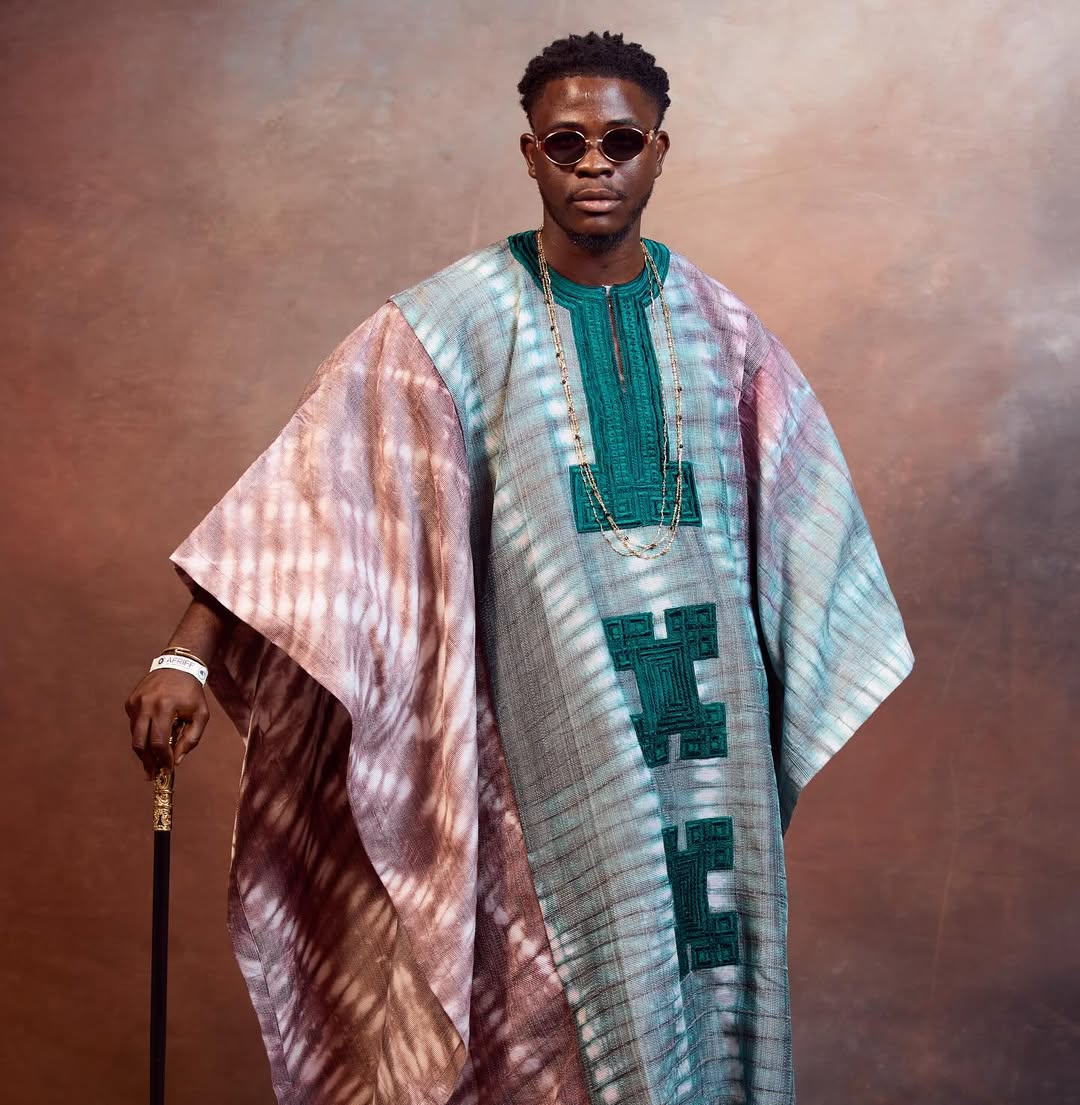
- Born: Femi Dapson; 4 March 1997 (age 29); Agege, Lagos State, Nigeria
- Citizenship: Nigerian
- Occupations: Film producer; Music video producer; Creative director
- Years active: 2018–present
- Known for: Founder of Nouvelle Films; producer of Rema's "Calm Down"
- Website: femidapson.com

Femi Dapson (born 4 March 1997) is a Nigerian film and music video producer, and the founder and executive producer of Nouvelle Films, a Lagos-based production company. He is best known for producing the music video for Rema's "Calm Down" (2022), which became the most-viewed Afrobeats music video on YouTube. Through Nouvelle Films, he has produced music videos for artists including Burna Boy, Davido, Rema, Asake, Central Cee, and Shallipopi, as well as commercial content for brands including Sony Music, Columbia Records, Oraimo, and Meta.

== Early life ==
Femi Dapson was born on 4 March 1997 in Agege, Lagos State, Nigeria, and is originally from Oyo State. He grew up in Idowu Egba, Igando, and has spoken publicly about experiencing significant financial hardship in childhood. He obtained a Bachelor of Science degree in Business Administration from the University of Lagos.

Before entering the entertainment industry, Dapson worked a series of manual jobs, including as a factory worker and a cleaner at a church in Ota. In 2017, he filmed himself while working as a cleaner, expressing conviction that his circumstances would change; the video later went viral on social media and was cited across multiple Nigerian media profiles as emblematic of his perseverance.

== Career ==
=== Beginnings ===
Dapson began working in music video production within Nigeria's Afrobeats industry around 2018–2020. His first notable production credit was the music video for "Money Anthem" by Macjreyz, an artist signed to Mr Eazi's talent development initiative EmPawa Africa. The production budget for that video was approximately ₦800,000, considerably below the industry average for a basic music video at the time, and the project opened doors to further work in the industry. During this period, he worked closely with Lagos-based photographer and director Perliks, gaining early experience in visual production, location management, and crew coordination.

Writing in Afrocritik, journalist Emmanuel Okoro explained that Dapson's role as a producer, distinct from a director, covers the full logistical and organisational scope of a production, including location casting, crew management, budgeting, and post-production oversight, a function that Okoro noted is frequently misunderstood or conflated with the director's creative role in the Nigerian industry.

=== Nouvelle Films and rise to prominence ===
In 2020, Dapson founded Nouvelle Films, a full-service production company based in Lagos specialising in music videos, commercials, and documentary content.

His breakthrough came with the music video for Rema's "Calm Down" (2022), produced in collaboration with director Director K. The video accompanied a song that became the first Afrobeats track to surpass one billion streams on Spotify, and its remix with Selena Gomez later won the inaugural MTV Video Music Award for Best Afrobeats Video. The video won The Headies Award for Best Music Video at the 16th Headies Awards in 2023, an award presented to its director; Dapson served as producer of the video. In the same awards cycle, Dapson received a nomination in the same category as producer of Blaqbonez's "Back in Uni", a video that Afrocritik described as requiring particular technical precision, with Blaqbonez portraying multiple real-life Nigerian industry figures and demanding close attention to costuming, lighting, and set design throughout.

Afrocritik described Dapson as one of Nigeria's award-winning music video producers and noted his standing among the most sought-after producers for high-budget Afrobeats productions. His subsequent portfolio included work with Burna Boy ("City Boy", "Update"), Davido featuring YG Marley ("Awuke"), Kizz Daniel ("Cough (Odo)"), Pheelz featuring BNXN ("Finesse"), and Asake with Central Cee ("Wave").

Dapson has collaborated with several internationally active music video directors on Nigerian productions, among them Daps (the Nigerian-British director also known as Flex God), Edgar Esteves, Meji Alabi, UAX, and Rob Dade. Premium Times reported in 2026 that production budgets for his projects had reached as high as ₦246 million, with crews of up to 200 people on a single shoot.

=== Commercial work ===
Through Nouvelle Films, Dapson has produced commercial campaigns for major brands, including Meta AI ("Make Am AI" TVC), Oraimo (Spacepods campaign featuring Burna Boy), and an official theme video for the 2023 Africa Cup of Nations. Sony Music and Columbia Records have also partnered with Nouvelle Films for campaigns in Nigeria.

== Selected filmography ==
Year	Title	Artist	Notes
2022	"Calm Down"	Rema	The Headies Award for Best Music Video (2023); most-viewed Afrobeats music video on YouTube
2022	"Back in Uni"	Blaqbonez	Nominated, The Headies Award for Best Music Video (2023)
2022	"Cough (Odo)"	Kizz Daniel	
2022	"Finesse"	Pheelz feat. BNXN	
2022	"City Boy"	Burna Boy	
2022	"Charm"	Rema	
2022	"Gwagwalada"	BNXN, Kizz Daniel & Seyi Vibez	
2023	"Wave"	Asake feat. Central Cee	Directed by Edgar Esteves; produced by Dapson
2024	"Awuke"	Davido feat. YG Marley	Directed by Daps
2025	"Update"	Burna Boy	
2025	"Kelebu"	Rema	

== Awards and nominations ==
Year	Award	Category	Role	Result	Ref
2023	The Headies	Best Music Video ("Calm Down" – Rema)	Producer	Won	
2023	The Headies	Best Music Video ("Back in Uni" – Blaqbonez)	Producer	Nominated	
2024	The Future Awards Africa	Film Category		Nominated	
2024	Gleamz Awards	Young Achiever of the Year		Nominated	

== Personal life ==
Dapson became engaged to Nigerian lifestyle content creator and fashion influencer Simi Sanya in July 2025, following a public proposal covered by Nigerian media outlets including BellaNaija and Pulse Nigeria. The couple held a court wedding ceremony in February 2026 and a traditional wedding ceremony in March 2026.

Outside of production, Dapson participates in mentorship and public speaking activities aimed at young Nigerians interested in careers in the creative industries. In 2025, Nouvelle Films collaborated with PEFTI Film Institute on an intensive music video production workshop.
