= The Headies Award for Best Music Video =

Nigerian music industry award

- Awarded for: The best conceptualist, best directed and most exciting video in the year under review
- Country: Nigeria
- Presented by: Hip Hop World Magazine
- First award: 2006
- Final award: 2023
- Website: theheadies.com

The Headies Award for Best Music Video is an award presented at The Headies, a ceremony that was established in 2006 and originally called the Hip Hop World Awards. (Note: The nominees for the 2006 edition are not included in the Recipients table because they are not available.) This award goes to the director. It was first awarded to Jude Okoye for the music video for "Get Squared" by P-Square in 2006.

== Recipients ==
Best Music Video
Year	Nominees	Result	Ref
2023	Director K for "Calm Down" by Rema	Won	
2023	Blaqbonez and Perliks for "Back in Uni" by Blaqbonez	Nominated	
2023	TG Omori for "Peace Be Unto You (PBUY)" by Asake	Nominated	
2023	Director Pink for "Spell (Remix)" by Chike and Oxlade	Nominated	
2023	TG Omori for "Bandana" by Fireboy DML and Asake	Nominated	
2023	Director K for "Common Person" by Burna Boy	Nominated	
2022	TG Omori for "Champion" by Fireboy DML and D Smoke	Won	
2022	Meji Alabi for "Ginger" by Wizkid featuring Burna Boy	Nominated	
2022	Director Pink for "Roju" by Chike	Nominated	
2022	Ovie Etseyatse for "Rain" by Yemi Alade featuring Mzansi Youth Choir	Nominated	
2022	TG Omori for "Bling" by Blaqbonez featuring Amaarae and Bnxn	Nominated	
2022	Director K for "Running" by Ladipoe featuring Fireboy DML	Nominated	
2020	Director K for "1 Milli" by Davido	Won	
2020	Clarence Peters for "Eli" by Fireboy DML	Nominated	
2020	Meji Alabi for "Smile" by Wizkid featuring H.E.R.	Nominated	
2020	TG Omori for "Billionaire" by Teni	Nominated	
2020	Ovie Etseyatse for "Shekere" by Yemi Alade featuring Angélique Kidjo	Nominated	
2019	Clarence Peters for "Dangote" by Burna Boy	Won	
2019	Clarence Peters for "Available" by Patoranking	Nominated	
2019	Aje Films for "Ire" by Adekunle Gold	Nominated	
2019	Prodigeezy for "Talk" by Falz	Nominated	
2019	88 Factor for "Jaiye" by Ladipoe	Nominated	
2018	Daps for "Come Closer" by Wizkid featuring Drake	Won	
2018	Meji Alabi for "Ma Lo" by Tiwa Savage featuring Wizkid	Nominated	
2018	Clarence Peters for "Focus" by Humblesmith	Nominated	
2018	Meji Alabi for "Been Calling" by Maleek Berry	Nominated	
2018	Meji Alabi for "Yolo" by Seyi Shay	Nominated	
2018	Daps for "Like Dat" by Davido	Nominated	
2016	Clarence Peters for "Soldier" by Falz featuring Simi	Won	
2016	Unlimited L.A for "Emergency" by D'banj	Nominated	
2016	Meji Alabi for "Mary" by Seyi Shay featuring Phyno	Nominated	
2016	Banky W. for "Made for You" by Banky W.	Nominated	
2016	Sesan for "Bad" by Tiwa Savage featuring Wizkid	Nominated	
2015	Unlimited L.A for "Katapot" by Reekado Banks	Won	
2015	Mex for "Jamb Question" by Simi	Nominated	
2015	Meji Alabi for "Crazy" by Seyi Shay featuring Wizkid	Nominated	
2015	Sesan for "The Sound" by Davido featuring Uhuru and DJ Buckz	Nominated	
2015	Clarence Peters for "Baby Jollof" by Solid Star featuring Tiwa Savage	Nominated	
2014	Clarence Peters for "Ada Ada" by Flavour	Won	
2014	Kemi Adetiba for "Toh Bad" by Niyola	Nominated	
2014	Aje Films for "Just Like That" by Rayce	Nominated	
2014	Unlimited L.A for "Oya Now" by Joe EL featuring Oritse Femi	Nominated	
2014	Jude "Engees" Okoye and Clarence Peters for "Personally" by P-Square	Nominated	
2013	Jude "Engees" Okoye and Clarence Peters for "Alingo" by P-Square	Won	
2013	Sesan for "Oliver Twist" by D'banj	Nominated	
2013	Aje Films for "Gaga Crazy" for Chuddy K	Nominated	
2013	Mr. Moe Musa for "Azonto" by Wizkid	Nominated	
2013	Clarence Peters for "Yes/No" by Banky W.	Nominated	
2012	Jude "Engees" Okoye for "Chop My Money" (Remix) by P-Square featuring Akon and May D	Won	
2012	Clarence Peters for "5 & 6" by Naeto C	Nominated	
2012	Aje Films for "Ara" by Brymo	Nominated	
2012	Mex for "Kosorombe" by Dipp featuring Dagrin	Nominated	
2011	DJ Tee for "Eni Duro" by Olamide	Won	
2011	Patrick Elis for "Holla at Your Boy" by Wizkid	Nominated	
2011	Clarence Peters for "You Know It" by Goldie featuring eLDee	Nominated	
2011	Gini for "Ko Ma Roll" by Mo'Cheddah	Nominated	
2011	Mex for "Pop Off Selecta" by Dipp	Nominated	
2010	Clarence Peters for "Finest" by Knighthouse featuring Sauce Kid and Teeto	Won	
2010	Jude "Engees" Okoye for "Danger" by P-Square	Nominated	
2010	Wudi Awa fro "Kokoroko" by Kefee featuring Timaya	Nominated	
2010	Bobby Boulders for "Ako Mi Ti Poju" by Naeto C	Nominated	
2010	Mex for "Safe" by M.I featuring Djinee	Nominated	
2009	Jude "Engees" Okoye for "Roll It" by P-Square	Won	
2009	Alfonso Dormun for "Bosi Gbangba" by eLDee	Nominated	
2009	DJ Tee for "Pere" by Mo'Hits	Nominated	
2009	Igho for "Naija Boy"	Nominated	
2008	DJ Tee for "Stylee" by DJ Jimmy Jatt featuring Mode 9, 2Face Idibia, and Elajoe	Won	
2008	Jude "Engees" Okoye for "Do Me" by P-Square featuring Waje	Nominated	
2008	TY Bello & Abbey for "Greenland" by TY Bello	Nominated	
2008	COSA for "Fire on the Mountain" by Aṣa	Nominated	
2008	Clarence Peters for "Sasha"	Nominated	
2007	Jude "Engees" Okoye for "Temptation" by P-Square	Won	
2007	Yomi Amoo for "Olori Oko" by Infinity	Nominated	
2007	Wudi Awa for "Kade" by Muma Gee	Nominated	
2007	Emma Gecko for "Cry" by Mode 9 featuring Nnenna	Nominated	
2007	DJ Tee for "Escalade" by Dare Art Alade	Nominated	
2007	Soul E for "Soul E Baba Dey Here" by Soul E	Nominated	
2006	Jude "Engees" Okoye for "Get Squared" by P-Square	Won	

== Category records ==
Most wins

Rank	1st	2nd	3rd	4th
Director	Jude "Engees" Okoye	Clarence Peters	Director K TG Omori; DJ Tee	Daps; Unlimited L.A
Total wins	5 wins	4 wins	3 wins	2 wins

Most nominations

Rank	1st	2nd	3rd	4th
Director	Clarence Peters	Meji Alabi	Director K TG Omori	Sesan
Total noms	14 nominations	9 nominations	8 nominations	3 nominations
