= Bandana (song) =

Single by Fireboy DML and Asake

from the album Playboy
- Released: 14 July 2022
- Genre: Afrobeats
- Length: 2:58
- Label: YBNL Nation; Empire
- Songwriters: Adedamola Adefolahan; Ahmed Ololade
- Producer: P.Priime

Fireboy DML singles chronology
| "Playboy" (2022) | "Bandana" (2022) | "Someone" (2023) |

Asake singles chronology
| "Peace Be Unto You (PBUY)" (2022) | "Bandana" (2022) | "Loaded" (2022) |

Music video
- "Bandana" on YouTube

"Bandana" is a song by Nigerian singers Fireboy DML FT Asake. It was released on 14 July 2022, through YBNL Nation and Empire Distribution, as the fourth and final single off Fireboy DML's third studio album Playboy (2022). The P.Priime-produced single spent seven weeks on the Nigeria Top 100 chart, becoming Fireboy DML's longest-running No. 1 single. It set a record for the biggest jump to No. 1 on the charts, with 4.48 million on-demand streams in a single week and a radio reach of 67.7 million.

== Background ==
Fireboy DML revealed that "Bandana" was born out of a collaborative effort during a busy period of touring. In an interview with Ebro, he disclosed that Asake recorded his part on a tour bus. The collaboration was initiated by Olamide, the head of YBNL Nation, who suggested that Fireboy feature Asake on the track. The two artists did not just meet from YBNL Nation, as they had known each other since their undergraduate years at Obafemi Awolowo University in Ilé-Ifẹ̀. Fireboy described Asake as a talented artist with a unique personality, noting that their similar experiences during their university days contributed to their strong collaboration.

== Reception ==
Adegboyega Adeleye of Vanguard described "Bandana" as a "fire-cracker single” in which Fireboy DML "re-affirms his hit-making status" and tells his "true story". He commended Asake for delivering a "monster chorus filled with meaning" and concluded that the song "didn't disappoint" as the two "made magic" together.

== Music video ==
The music video for "Bandana," directed by filmmaker and cinematographer TG Omori, was released on 17 August 2022. The video is set in a futuristic world and sees Fireboy DML leading an army of supporters.

== Awards and nominations ==
Awards and nominations for "Bandana"
| Organization | Year | Category | Result | Ref. |
|---|---|---|---|---|
| The Headies | 2023 | Best Music Video | Nominated | |
| The Headies | 2023 | Viewer's Choice | Nominated | |
| Soundcity MVP Awards Festival | 2023 | Video of the Year | Won | |
| MTV Video Music Awards | 2023 | Best Afrobeats Video | Nominated | |

== Commercial performance ==
"Bandana" was released on 14 July 2022, as part of the rollout for Fireboy DML's third studio album, Playboy (2022). The song quickly became a commercial success, debuting at No. 66 on the Nigeria Top 100 after being available for just one day in its first tracking week. By the next week, it made a historic leap to No. 1, marking the biggest jump to the top position in the history of the chart. In its second week, "Bandana" solidified its position at No. 1, tallying 3.53 million streams (No. 1 on streaming) and 56.9 million in radio reach (No. 1 on radio). The song remained at the top for six or seven weeks, making it Fireboy DML's longest-running No. 1 single in Nigeria, surpassing the four-week reign of his hit "Peru." It also became Asake's longest-running No. 1, overtaking his previous chart-toppers like "Omo Ope," "Sungba," and "Peace Be Unto You (PBUY)." During its run, "Bandana" achieved significant milestones, such as logging 4.48 million streams and a radio reach of 67.7 million in a single week, setting a record as the biggest No. 1 song in the history of the Nigeria Top 100. It fended off competition from major hits like Asake's "Peace Be Unto You," Burna Boy's "For My Hand" featuring Ed Sheeran, and Crayon's "Ijo (Laba Laba)." The song's enduring popularity was fueled by its dominance on platforms like Apple Music, Spotify, Boomplay, Audiomack, and YouTube, as well as its strong radio presence. Notably, "Bandana" marked Fireboy DML's first No. 1 entry on the chart and Asake's second No. 1 after "Omo Ope."

== Charts ==
Chart performance for "Bandana"
| Chart (2022) | Peak position |
|---|---|
| UK Afrobeats (Official Charts) | 3 |
| US Afrobeats Songs (Billboard) | 8 |

== Certifications ==
Certifications for "Bandana"
| Region | Certification | Certified units/sales |
|---|---|---|
| New Zealand (RMNZ) | Gold | 15,000^{‡} |
| Nigeria (TCSN) | 6× Platinum | 600,000^{‡} |
| United Kingdom (BPI) | Silver | 200,000^{‡} |
| United States (RIAA) | Gold | 500,000^{‡} |
^{‡} Sales+streaming figures based on certification alone.

== Personnel ==
Credits adapted from liner notes and Apple Music.

- Adedamola Adefolahan – vocals, songwriter
- Ahmed Ololade - vocals, songwriter
- P.Priime - production
- Demetrius Bell - mixing engineer
- Magicsticks - mixing engineer
- Irv Johnson - mastering engineer

== Release history ==
Release history and formats for "Bandana"
| Region | Date | Format | Label |
|---|---|---|---|
| Various | 14 July 2022 | Streaming; digital download | YBNL Nation; Empire |

== See also ==
- List of best-selling singles by country
