= Laughter, Tears and Goosebumps =

Studio album by Fireboy DML
- Released: November 29, 2019
- Recorded: 2018–2019
- Genre: Afro-Life; R&B
- Length: 40:00
- Label: YBNL Nation
- Producer: Pheelz; Cracker Mallo; Echo the Guru; IamBeatz; P.Priime

Fireboy DML chronology
Laughter, Tears and Goosebumps (2019)	Apollo (2020)

Singles from Laughter, Tears and Goosebumps
- 1. "Jealous" Released: March 25, 2019; 2. "What If I Say" Released: June 14, 2019; 3. "King" Released: August 1, 2019

Laughter, Tears and Goosebumps (abbreviated as LTG) is the debut studio album by Nigerian singer Fireboy DML. It was released by YBNL Nation on November 29, 2019. The album comprises thirteen tracks and doesn't feature any guest act. It was produced by Pheelz, Cracker Mallo, Echo the Guru, IamBeatz and P.Priime. LTG was supported by the previously released singles "Jealous", "What If I Say" and "King". It received generally positive reviews from music critics, but was criticized for being labeled an "Afro-Life" record instead of an R&B album.

== Background and promotion ==
LTG was initially scheduled for release on November 25, 2019, but ended up being released four days later. The album's music is a brand of R&B that combines love and social issues with empirical songwriting. LTG comprises thirteen tracks and doesn't feature any guest artist; it amassed over 6 million streams on Spotify three days after its release. LTG was supported by the previously released singles "Jealous", "What If I Say" and "King". It was produced by Pheelz, Cracker Mallo, Echo the Guru, IamBeatz and P.Prime.

=== "Jealous", "What If I Say", and "King" ===
The album's lead single, "Jealous," was originally included on YBNL Nation's joint album YBNL Mafia Family (2018). It was then reissued on March 25, 2019, and is composed of guitar riffs, traditional drums and percussion. The song combines African harmonies with elements of country and soul music. Produced by Cracker Mallo, "Jealous" revolves around love and the complex emotions that accompany it. The song was nominated for Song of the Year at both The Headies 2019 and 2020 Soundcity MVP Awards Festival. The video for "Jealous" was filmed by Director K.

The romantic track "What If I Say" was released on June 14, 2019, as the album's second single. The Pheelz-produced track is driven by percussion, ambient synth harmonies, and a drum riff. The video for "What If I Say" was directed by TG Omori. On August 1, 2019, Fireboy DML released the album's third single, "King", which was produced by Echo the Guru. On the record, he declares his worth to his love interest. The TG Omori-directed music video for "King" contains images of Fireboy DML and his love interest in a rose petal embellished Rolls Royce. The video also features clips of him singing at a fashion show where models walk on a runway.

=== "Scatter" and "Vibration" ===
On November 28, 2019, Fireboy DML released the video for the EDM-fueled track "Scatter". It features post-apocalyptic scenes of the singer waking up dead people with a device on his wrist and accompanying them to a dance party. Additionally, the video honors the Joker character from DC Comics. On January 13, 2020, Fireboy DML released the Clarence Peters-directed music video for "Need You", an acoustic guitar-driven ballad. The singer and his romantic interest are shown in the video trying to flee before being apprehended by someone attempting to split them up.

On February 10, 2020, Fireboy DML released the video for "Vibration", which was directed by TG Omori. He appears in a ballroom with ballet dancers doing the foxtrot and mambo.

== Composition ==
On the guitar-led album's opener "Need You", Fireboy DML pours his heart out to his lover and tries to make his romantic feelings known to her. The track borrows from Kola Ogunkoya's "Sweetie Baby" and is a cover of Ed Sheeran's "Tenerife Sea". In "Like I Do", Fireboy DML blends R&B with lightweight melodies and tungba percussion. In the Pheelz-produced track "Gbas Gbos", he infuses aspects of his personality with lyrics about realism; the song is composed of drums and guitar riffs. "Scatter" and its accompanying music video portray Fireboy DML as the "life of the party"; the song is powered by an electro-funk bass line.

In the afro-house track "Omo Ologo", Fireboy DML draws influences from his indigenous background and is reminiscent of Zlatan and Naira Marley. The mid-tempo track "Energy" features drums and ominous chants. The pop-esque track "Vibration" merges EDM piano chords with guitar chords and a trumpet. "High on Life" contains an Afrobeat drum arrangement and is sonically similar to "Gbas Gbos".

== Critical reception ==
Professional ratings
Review scores
Source	Rating
TooXclusive	9/10
Pulse Nigeria	7.5/10

LTG received positive reviews from music critics. TooXclusive's Oluwatobi Ibironke granted a rating of 9 out of 10, saying its "happy party music is the laughter, the soulfulness of his [Fireboy DML's] love lines causes the goosebumps, while the troubles of his heart evokes the tears". Pulse Nigeria's Motolani Alake awarded the album 7.5 out of 10, calling it "formidable" and commending Fireboy DML for "justifying his talent and burgeoning reputation with an anthem for love season". Conversely, Alake criticized him for labeling his music "Afro-Life" instead of R&B. The Native's Debola Abimbolu characterized LTG as a "pop project whose mission is to improve the mood of any listener" and applauded the singer for finding the "sweet spot between partying and romance".

In a review for NotJustOk, Emmanuel Esomnofu praised Fireboy DML's voice and romantic tendencies, saying he's "confessional and exuberant – delivering overwhelming doses of emotion".

== Track listing ==
All tracks are written by Adedamola Adefolahan.

No.	Title	Producer(s)	Length
1.	"Need You"	Pheelz	3:41
2.	"Vibration"	IamBeatz	3:18
3.	"Scatter"	Pheelz	2:44
4.	"Jealous"	Cracker Mallo	3:36
5.	"Energy"	Pheelz	3:33
6.	"Like I Do"	P.Priime	3:52
7.	"Gbas Gbos"	Pheelz	2:33
8.	"King"	Echo the Guru	2:45
9.	"Omo Ologo"	Cracker Mallo	2:22
10.	"High on Life"	Pheelz	2:30
11.	"Feel"	Cracker Mallo	3:14
12.	"What If I Say"	Pheelz	3:33
13.	"Wait and See"	Pheelz	2:46
Total length:			40:00

== Personnel ==
Credits adapted from the album's back cover.

- Fireboy DML – primary artist, writing, mixing (track 8)
- Olamide Adedeji – executive producer
- Pheelz – production (tracks 1, 3, 5, 7, 10, 12, 13), mixing/mastering (tracks 4, 10)
- Cracker Mallo – production (tracks 4, 9, 11)
- Echo the Guru – production (track 8)
- P.Prime – production (track 6)
- IamBeatz – production (track 2)
- STG – mixing/mastering (track 1, 2, 3, 5, 6, 7, 9, 11, 12, 13)
- Redemption Beatz – mastering (track 8)
- Godwyn – acoustic guitar (track 1)
- Emmy – photography
- Dayo Cyrus – graphics
- Olaitan - Music Plugger

== Release history ==
Region	Date	Format	Label
Various	November 29, 2019	CD; digital download; streaming	YBNL Nation
