= All of Us (Ashawo) =

Song by Fireboy DML

from the album Playboy
- Language: Yoruba; English
- Released: 5 August 2022
- Genre: Afrobeats
- Length: 3:03
- Label: YBNL Nation; Empire
- Songwriter: Adedamola Adefolahan
- Producer: Telz

Music video
- "All Of Us (Ashawo)" on YouTube

"All of Us (Ashawo)", also known simply as "Ashawo", is a song by Nigerian singer Fireboy DML. It is the third track off his third studio album Playboy (2022), and was produced by Telz.

== Composition and lyrics ==
"All of Us (Ashawo)" by Fireboy DML explores themes of infidelity and the complexities of modern relationships. The song, produced by Telz and featuring Amechi Donald's guitar instrumentation, incorporates elements of Yoruba and English. Its lyrics address the challenges of fame and its impact on romantic relationships, using the Nigerian term "ashawo" (often associated with promiscuity) as a metaphor for human desires and vulnerabilities.

== Critical reception ==
Tela Wangeci of the Native highlighted "All of Us (Ashawo)" as a sharp standout on Fireboy DML's Playboy album, praising its irresistible production and Fireboy's ability to balance blunt, introspective lyrics with catchy melodies. Wangeci noted that the song captures the complexities of modern relationships with a playful yet profound edge. She commended Fireboy’s "knack for masking blunt lines with honeyed tones," describing the track as "upbeat and catchy" while delivering a relatable narrative about the blurred lines between love and desire in today’s world. Wangeci concluded, "Whether you can relate to his message or not, it’s upbeat and catchy, and that’s exactly what we all need right now."

== Music video ==
The music video for "All of Us (Ashawo)" was released on 28 October 2022. It was directed by Clarence Peters.

== Credits and personnel ==
Credits are adapted from Apple Music.

- Adedamola Adefolahan — vocals, songwriting
- Telz — production
- Amechi Ezenna — guitar
- Demetrius Bell — mixing engineer

== Charts ==
=== Weekly charts ===
Chart performance for "All of Us (Ashawo)"
Chart (2022)	Peak position
Nigeria (TurnTable Top 100)	16
UK Afrobeats (Official Charts)	8
US Afrobeats Songs (Billboard)	12

=== Year-end charts ===
2022 year-end chart performance for "All of Us (Ashawo)"
Chart (2022)	Position
US Afrobeats Songs (Billboard)	98

== Certifications ==
Certifications for All of Us (Ashawo)
Region	Certification	Certified units/sales
Nigeria (TCSN)	Platinum	100,000^{‡}
^{‡} Sales+streaming figures based on certification alone.
