= Playboy (Fireboy DML album) =

Studio album by Fireboy DML
- Released: 5 August 2022
- Genre: Afrobeats
- Length: 43:00
- Language: English; Yoruba; Nigerian Pidgin
- Label: YBNL Nation; Empire
- Producer: Eskeez; P.Priime; Telz; Bizzouch; Phantom; Zaki Amujei; Kel-P; Shizzi; Kolten; Type A

Fireboy DML chronology
Apollo (2020)	Playboy (2022)	Adedamola (2024)

Singles from Playboy
- 1. "Peru" Released: 21 July 2021; 2. "Peru (Remix)" Released: 24 December 2021; 3. "Playboy" Released: 24 March 2022; 4. "Bandana" Released: 14 July 2022

Playboy is the third studio album by Nigerian singer and songwriter Fireboy DML. It was released by YBNL Nation on 5 August 2022 and was distributed by Empire Distribution. The album features guest appearances from Shenseea, Rema, Asake, Chris Brown, Euro and Ed Sheeran. Fireboy enlisted producers such as P.Priime, Kel-P, Zaki Amujei, Bizzouch, Telz, Eskeez, Blaisebeatz, Shizzi, Phantom, Kolten and Type A to produce songs for the album. The album serves as a follow-up to Apollo (2021).

== Background and singles ==
The concept of Playboy emerged when Fireboy DML, feeling creatively stuck, gained a sense of freedom and clarity during a trip to the U.S., which led to the creation of "Peru" and reignited his artistic direction, inspiring him to finish his album. He said this in an interview with OkayAfrica:

"Last year I was practically lost creatively so I kept on making music sporadically and in July I took my first trip to the United States. I took a walk in New York City with a cigarette stick in my hand, didn’t smoke it, just kept walking for about fifteen minutes. Nobody recognized or looked at me twice or gave a fuck about me and that walk of freedom opened my mind. I just felt so free. I took that energy with me to Miami, went to a strip club, had the time of my life and then to San Francisco where I made "Peru." Recording "Peru" opened my eyes and gave me a sense of direction and I knew it was time for a new album. I went back to Lagos to finish up the album. It was ready by late last year, but I wanted to tease out the release,"

Fireboy DML shared.

The album was preceded by four singles. The lead single, "Peru" was released on 21 July 2021 and produced by Shizzi and Kolten. The song, assumed to be dedicated to the country of Peru, is actually a reference to Nigerian singer Peruzzi. The widely known single ended up getting a remix with British pop artist Ed Sheeran, which was released as the second single off Playboy on 24 December 2021. The third single is the Bizzouch-produced title track, "Playboy", and was released on 24 March 2022. The fourth and final single, "Bandana" features label mate Asake and was released on 14 July 2022 and produced by P.Priime.

== Critical reception ==
Professional ratings
Review scores
Source	Rating
Afrocritik	8.5/10
Pitchfork	7.4/10
Pulse Nigeria	7.8/10
NME	5/5 stars

Playboy received generally positive reviews from critics. Heven Haile of Pitchfork rated Fireboy DML's Playboy a 7.4/10, highlighting his shift from loverboy to suave rock star while grappling with newfound fame. The review noted that Fireboy "invites the world to the lively sounds of his hometown" with feel-good vibes and a universal appeal. Tracks like "Glory" and "Havin Fun" showcased his carefree side, though his more heartfelt moments, like "Diana," affirmed that he excels at yearning and emotional depth. Adeayo Adebiyi of Pulse Nigeria described Playboy as Fireboy DML’s transition from "lover boy to a superstar rolling stone," embracing fame and its indulgences while asking to "live a little." The review highlighted thematic cohesion, strong production, and enjoyable singles but noted some tracks like "Sofri" and "Timoti" as bland and criticized the inclusion of the original "Peru" as unnecessary. Despite lacking the artistic depth of his earlier works, Playboy earned a 7.8/10 rating, deemed a "Victory."

According to writers Wonu, Tela, Moore, and Oluebube from The Native, Playboy is a "commendable body of work" where his "prolific storytelling skills" and "impeccable record as a writer" shine through, with standout tracks like "Peru" praised for its "timeless songwriting and production" (Tela) and "Ashawo" noted for its "suave production and melody" (Wonu). Emmanuel Daraloye, in a review for Afrocritik, praised the album as Fireboy's most cheerful and fun album yet, noting its diverse soundscape and themes of fame, love, and hedonism. He remarked that while "all the playboy angles are explored," the album is "artistically lower than his first two albums" but offers something for everyone. Daraloye rated the album 8.5/10. Mankaprr Conteh of Rolling Stone highlighted Playboy as a strong mix of charming songs and engaging storytelling, celebrating Fireboy DML’s rise in status while staying rooted in Afrobeats and Caribbean influences. The review praised tracks like "Sofri," "Compromise," and "Ashawo" for their suave narratives and Fireboy’s seamless blend of English, pidgin, and Yoruba. While noting sequencing issues that created monotony in parts, Conteh described the album’s end as “powerful” and commended Fireboy’s endearing earnestness throughout. Kyann-Sian Williams of NME described Playboy as a confident and multifaceted project, awarding it a perfect 5/5 rating. The review highlighted Fireboy's emotional depth on tracks like "Change," his party-ready appeal on "Bandana," and his seamless collaborations with Chris Brown, Rema, and Shenseea. Williams called "Timoti" the album’s "true stand-out moment," emphasizing its showcase of Fireboy's vocal abilities and authority in the genre. Michael Aromolaran of The Culture Custodian’s review of Playboy by Fireboy DML notes a shift from romantic themes to a more cynical, fame-focused persona. Aromolaran says that the album has its "silver moments," but lacks the creativity and courage of his earlier work, making it feel repetitive. The review concludes, "A less cynical Fireboy would have made a better album."

== Track listing ==
No.	Title	Writer(s)	Producer(s)	Length
1.	"Change"	Adedamola Adefolahan	Eskeez	2:42
2.	"Bandana" (featuring Asake)	Adefolahan; Ahmed Ololade	P.Priime	2:58
3.	"Ashawo"	Adefolahan	Telz	3:03
4.	"Playboy"	Adefolahan	Bizzouch	3:27
5.	"Adore" (featuring Euro)	Adefolahan	P.Priime	3:21
6.	"Sofri"	Adefolahan	Blaisebeatz	2:59
7.	"Diana" (featuring Chris Brown and Shenseea)	Adefolahan; Christopher Brown; Chinsea Lee	Phantom	3:52
8.	"Compromise" (featuring Rema)	Adefolahan; Divine Ikubor	Zaki Amujei	3:15
9.	"Timoti"	Adefolahan	Kel-P	2:19
10.	"Peru"	Adefolahan; Ivory Scott; Kolten Perine; Oluwaseyi Akerele	Shizzi; Kolten	2:31
11.	"Afro Highlife"	Adefolahan	Zaki Amujei	3:07
12.	"Havin' Fun"	Adefolahan	P.Priime	2:57
13.	"Peru" (remix; with Ed Sheeran)	Adefolahan; Scott; Akerele; Perine; Edward Sheeran	Shizzi; Kolten	3:07
14.	"Glory"	Adefolahan	Type A	3:46
Total length:				43:00

== Personnel ==
- Adedamola "Fireboy DML" Adefolahan – vocals, writer, executive producer
- Ahmed "Asake" Ololade – vocals, writer
- Divine "Rema" Ikubor – vocals, writer
- Edward "Ed" Sheeran – vocals, writer
- Christopher "Chris" Brown – vocals, writer
- Chinsea "Shenseea" Lee – vocals, writer
- Eufradis "Euro" Rodriguez – vocals
- Ivory Scott – writer
- Kolten Perine – producer, writer
- Oluwaseyi "Shizzi" Akerele – producer, writer
- Kelenna "Type A" Agada – producer
- Okikiolu "Zaki Amujei" Awoyele – producer, additional vocals
- Udoma "Kel-P" Amba – producer
- Adenola "Eskeez" Gabriel – producer
- Ayobami "Phantom" Olaleye – producer
- Alli "Telz" Odunayo – producer
- John "Bizzouch" Oche – producer
- Marcel "Blaisebeatz" Akunwata – producer
- Peace "P.Priime" Oredope – producer, mixing engineer
- Adedolapo "Nxrth" Adefolahan – mixing engineer
- Demitrius Bell – mixing engineer
- Kareem "Magicsticks" Temitayo – mixing engineer
- Trehy Harris – mixing engineer
- Amechi Donald Ezenna – guitar
- Awele Michael – lead guitar
- Alabi Ayodeji Henry – lead guitar
- Ayodele Gbabiaka – bass guitar
- Michael Edem Senyagbetor – piano
- Emmanuel Tetteh – bass guitar
- Akinkuade Ademola Philip – lead guitar
- Yewande Esan – additional vocals
- Alakpa Victor Oghenekaro – drums
- Lagos Blessing Oghenerasome – bass guitar

== Charts ==
Chart performance for Playboy
Chart (2022)	Peak position
Nigerian Albums (TurnTable)	9
US Billboard 200	123
US Independent Albums (Billboard)	16

== Release history ==
Release history and formats for Playboy
Region	Date	Format	Label
Various	5 August 2022	Streaming; digital download	YBNL; Empire
Various	23 September 2022	CD	YBNL; Empire
Various	14 October 2022	LP; vinyl	YBNL; Empire
United States	14 April 2023	Vinyl	YBNL; Empire
