= Adedamola =

Studio album by Fireboy DML
- Released: 29 August 2024
- Genres: Afrobeats; R&B; pop
- Length: 40:00
- Languages: English; Nigerian Pidgin; Yoruba
- Labels: YBNL; Empire
- Producers: Drexbeats; Magicsticks; Blaisebeatz; Lagbaja; Telz; Godomarr; Foreigngotem; WXLA; Nxrthmix; Spinall; Bassiqally; Jon Batiste; Southtag; Semzi; Pheelz; Eskeez; ID Cabasa

Fireboy DML chronology
| Playboy (2022) | Adedamola (2024) | Peace by Piece (2025) |

Singles from Adedamola
- 1. "Yawa" Released: 22 June 2023; 2. "Obaa Sima" Released: 7 December 2023; 3. "Everyday" Released: 3 May 2024

Adedamola (stylized in lowercase) is the eponymous fourth studio album by Nigerian singer and songwriter Fireboy DML. It was released on 29 August 2024 by YBNL Nation and Empire, and features guest appearances from artists Seun Kuti, Jon Batiste, Lagbaja, Lojay and disc jockey Spinall. The album featured production from Drexbeats, Magicsticks, Blaisebeatz, Lagbaja, Telz, Godomarr, Foreigngotem, WXLA, Nxrthmix, Spinall, Bassiqally, Jon Batiste, Southtag, Semzi, Pheelz, Eskeez and ID Cabasa. The album serves as a follow-up to Playboy (2022).

== Background ==
Fireboy said that the reason for the name of the album was because, "Every single part of me went into this album. It's so personal and feels nostalgic, like a call to home. That's why it's titled Adedamola. I'm excited to share it with the world."

On 30 August 2024, Adedamola was voted favorite new music release of the past week in a Billboard poll.

== Singles ==
The album's lead single "Yawa" was released on 22 June 2023. The song was produced by Magicsticks and Telz and arrived with a Blank Square Production-directed music video. The second single "Obaa Sima" was released on 7 December 2023 and produced by Bassiqally, Nxrthmix, and Pheelz alongside "Outside" featuring Blaqbonez. The third and final single off Adedamola, the Blaisebeatz-produced "Everyday", was released on 3 May 2024 with an accompanying lyric video.

== Critical reception ==
Professional ratings
Review scores
| Source | Rating |
|---|---|
| The Upper Entertainment | 10/10 |
| NotJustOk | 8.7/10 |
| Pulse Nigeria | 8/10 |
| Afrocritik | 7.4/10 |

Pulse Nigeria's Adeayo Adebiyi said the album restores the "familiarity that won him the love and admiration of listeners", adding that it "achieves cohesiveness through R&B and Afropop exploration", and rating it 8.0/10. Hope Ibiale of Afrocritik called Adedamola a "versatile and meticulously crafted project that showcases Fireboy DML's vocal dexterity" and said that it "represents another extension of his artistry", awarding it a rating of 7.4/10. Olukorede Owoeye of Nigerian Entertainment Today called Adedamola "music… I fell in love with", adding that it "put a finger on the soft spot I once had for him" and concluding that it was "one of the best albums to drop this year".

Ademoye Afeez of NotJustOk wrote that Adedamola showed Fireboy DML "returning to his roots and staying true to himself," noting that he "seamlessly blends his different personas into a relatable and captivating whole", He rated it 8.7/10, concluding that the album showed he could grow "while still remaining cohesive" and was "definitely in the Album of the Year conversation". Bomi Anifowose of the Upper Entertainment saw Adedamola as reminiscent of his debut, "only this time, improved". Anifowose added that on the album, "his vocals are unapologetically at his best", concluding that it was "the product of a beautiful soul", and giving it a complete 10/10 rating.

== Track listing ==
Adedamola track listing
| No. | Title | Writer(s) | Producer(s) | Length |
|---|---|---|---|---|
| 1. | "Iseoluwa" | Adedamola Adefolahan | Bassiqally; Nxrth | 3:18 |
| 2. | "Call Me" | Adedolapo Adefolahan | Bassiqally; Nxrth | 2:47 |
| 3. | "Ecstasy" (featuring Seun Kuti) | Adefolahan | Bassiqally | 3:32 |
| 4. | "Hell and Back" | Adefolahan | Nxrth; ForeignGotEM; South | 2:41 |
| 5. | "Letting Go" (featuring Lojay) | Adefolahan; Lekan Onifeso Jr. | Godomarr | 2:35 |
| 6. | "Back n Forth" (featuring Lagbaja) | Adefolahan; Bisade Ologunde | Lagbaja; Eskeez; Bassiqally; ID Cabasa; Nxrth | 3:32 |
| 7. | "Ready" (featuring Jon Batiste) | Adefolahan; Jon Batiste; Marcel Akunwata | Jon Batiste; Blaisebeatz | 3:14 |
| 8. | "Wande's Bop" (featuring Spinall) | Adefolahan | Spinall; Wxla; Semzi; Eskeez | 2:43 |
| 9. | "Change Your Life" | Adefolahan | Bassiqally; Semzi | 3:17 |
| 10. | "Obaa Sima" | Adefolahan | Bassiqally; Nxrth; Pheelz | 3:05 |
| 11. | "Need Me" | Adefolahan; Ayodele Agbaika | Bassiqally; Drexbeats | 2:32 |
| 12. | "Yawa" | Adefolahan; Alli Odunayo; Kareem Temitayo | Magicsticks; Telz | 3:00 |
| 13. | "Everyday" | Adefolahan | Blaisebeatz; Hightone | 2:45 |
| 14. | "Jon's Interlude" (featuring Jon Batiste) | Adefolahan | Jon Batiste | 1:51 |
| Total length: | | | | 40:00 |

== Personnel ==
- Adedamola "Fireboy DML" Adefolahan – vocals, executive production
- Seun Kuti – vocals
- Bisade "Lagbaja" Ologunde – vocals, production, songwriting
- Lekan "Lojay" Onifeso Jr. – vocals, songwriting
- Sodamola "Spinall" Desmond – vocals, production, mixing
- Jon Batiste – vocals, production, piano
- Wande Esan – additional vocals
- Ayodele "Bassiqally" Agbabiaka O. – production, additional vocals
- Adesewa Solagbade – additional vocals
- Susan Anike Akinpelu – additional vocals
- Temitope Olowookere – additional vocals
- Daniel Oyelami – talking drum
- Seun Abutu – saxophone
- Adedolapo "Nxrth" Adefolahan – songwriting, production, recording
- Baby D – recording
- Mike Seaberg – mixing, mastering
- Julius Olabiyi – trumpet
- Maurice Edefe – guitar
- Vid "ForeignGotEM" Vucenovic – production
- South – production
- Promise Adedayo Aroninuola – guitar
- Godomarr – production
- David Oluwaferanmi Rotimi – recording
- Adenola "Eskeez" Gabriel – production
- Olumide "ID Cabasa" Ogunade – production
- Marcel "Blaisebeatz" Akunwata – songwriting, production
- Wxla – production
- Banjo "Semzi" Kayode – production
- Jesuyemi John – violin
- Phillip "Pheelz" Moses – production
- Drexbeats – production
- Olamide Adedeji – additional vocals, executive production
- Ahmed "Asake" Ololade – additional vocals
- Oyebanjo "B.Banks" Bankole – additional vocals, recording
- Kareem "Magicsticks" Temitayo – songwriting, production, mixing, mastering
- Alli Odunayo – songwriting, production
- Nicholas Calaveri – mixing, engineering
- Femi Olawoyin – violin
- Saxbarrister – saxophone
- Hightone – production
- Michael "Synx" Nwachukwu – mixing, mastering
- Olaitan Salaudeen — music, video plugger

== Release history ==
Release history and formats for Adedamola
| Region | Date | Format | Label |
|---|---|---|---|
| Worldwide | 29 August 2024 | Streaming; digital download | YBNL; Empire |
| Worldwide | 25 October 2024 | CD; LP | YBNL; Empire |
| Worldwide | 13 December 2024 | Vinyl | YBNL; Empire |
