= Wonderful (Burna Boy song) =

2020 song by Burna Boy

Single by Burna Boy

from the album Twice as Tall
- Released: June 26, 2020
- Recorded: 2020
- Genre: Afrobeats
- Length: 3:33
- Label: Spaceship; Atlantic; Warner Music
- Songwriter: Damini Ogulu
- Producer: Telz

Burna Boy singles chronology
"Jerusalema" (2020)	"Wonderful" (2020)	"My Oasis" (2020)

Music video
- "Wonderful " on YouTube

"Wonderful" is a song by Nigerian singer Burna Boy. It was released on June 26, 2020, as the lead single from his fifth studio album Twice as Tall (2020). The song was produced by Nigerian record producer Telz. It debuted at number 16 on Billboard's World Digital Song Sales chart.

== Background and composition ==
"Wonderful" was produced by Telz and sees Burna Boy expressing excitement for his people and the globalization of their unique sound. It was recorded in Nigerian pidgin and Yoruba. The song is a mixture of soul, reggaeton, a little bit of house, and the vocal texture of Kwaito music. The record producer Telz made a simple instrumental with staccato melodies and a fast-tempo reggaeton percussion. The song talks about the importance of working hard and returning home.

== Music video ==
An accompanying music video for "Wonderful" was released on June 26, 2020, and was directed by Director K; it depicts old African ways. In it, Burna Boy is seen lying asleep on a palm frond, somewhere in the land of warriors, kings and queens, he's then woken from his drowse by a gorilla and ambushed by some warriors dressed in traditional attire, before turning into a celebration where both the warriors and the singer began dancing. Burna Boy is dressed as a warrior and hailed a champion. Upon the release of the song, Burna Boy said "This song is about the wonders of seeing the impact of my music on people's lives as they shared their joy, pain and pleasure with me while I toured the world".

== Critical response ==
"Wonderful" received positive reviews from music critics and consumers. In a review for Pitchfork, Mankaprr Conteh praised the song's production and said "the singer revels in the alchemy of rhythm and hustle. He's mystified by what beats and drums can conjure, the way they spread joy and spark motion from your toes to your scalp". Chioma Onyefuosaonu of tooXclusive awarded the song video three stars out of five, noting that the "costume and make up for this video was well executed. The tribal markings, the clothing choice and the setting depicts old African ways". An editor for SoundStroke gave "Wonderful" an 8.0/10 rating, stating that "the overall production was good as the vocals were balanced with the instrumental".

== Charts ==
Chart (2020)	Peak position
US World Digital Song Sales (Billboard)	16
UK Afrobeats Singles (Official Charts Company)	4
