= Real Life (Burna Boy song) =

Single by Burna Boy featuring Stormzy

from the album Twice As Tall
- Language: English; Pidgin
- Released: 2020
- Genre: Afrobeats
- Label: Spaceship; Atlantic
- Songwriters: Damini Ogulu; Michael Ebenezer Kwadjo Omari Owuo Jr
- Producer: Telz

"Real Life" is a song by Nigerian singer and songwriter Burna Boy, featuring British rapper Stormzy. It appears on Burna Boy’s fifth studio album, Twice as Tall. The official music video was released on October 2, 2020.

== Charts ==
Weekly chart performance for "Real Life"
Chart (2020)	Peak position
UK Singles (OCC)	54
UK Hip Hop/R&B (OCC)	36
US World Digital Song Sales (Billboard)	21

== Certifications ==
Region	Certification	Certified units/sales
Australia (ARIA)	Gold	35,000^{‡}
New Zealand (RMNZ)	Gold	15,000^{‡}
United Kingdom (BPI)	Silver	200,000^{‡}
^{‡} Sales+streaming figures based on certification alone.
