= Perliks =

Nigerian music video director and photographer

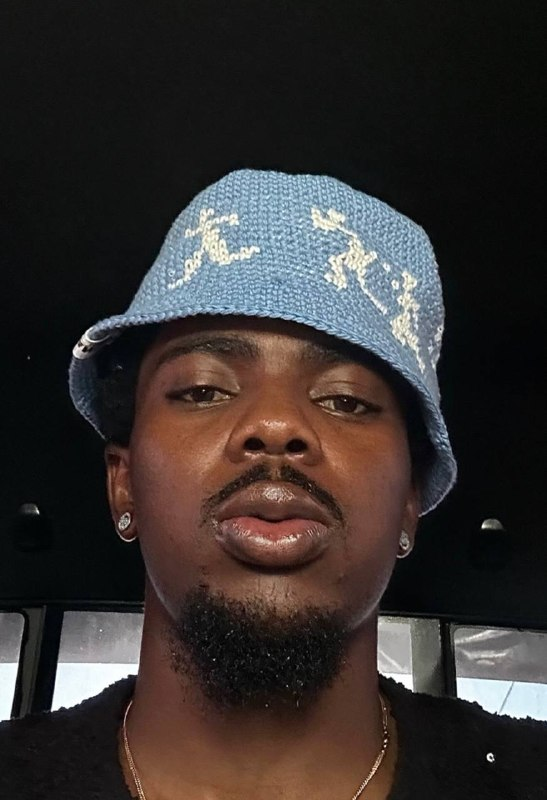
- Born: Abdulrasaq Adebayo Babalola; Lagos State, Nigeria
- Citizenship: Nigerian
- Occupations: Music video director; Photographer
- Years active: 2012–present
- Known for: Music video direction; the Plastic Angel installation

Perliks, born Abdulrasaq Adebayo Babalola and also known as A Perliks Definition, is a Nigerian music video director and photographer based in Lagos. He has directed music videos for Nigerian artists like Rema, Blaqbonez, Adekunle Gold and Shallipopi, and in 2021 created the environmental art installation Plastic Angel, which was covered by international broadcasters like WION and CBC.

== Early life ==
Perliks was born Abdulrasaq Adebayo Babalola in Lagos State. He is the son of Tajudeen Babalola Ojora, known professionally as Telemoon, a music video director associated with the Nigerian Fuji music scene who worked with artists including Wasiu Ayinde (K1 De Ultimate), Pasuma and Saheed Osupa.

According to Afrocritik and Nairametrics, he began working at his father's production house in Mushin, Lagos, editing footage of Fuji performances before moving into photography and, later, music video direction.

== Career ==
=== Early work ===
Perliks began directing short videos around 2012. His first widely credited music video was "Money Anthem" by the Macjreyz, released through Mr Eazi's EmPawa Africa initiative in 2020. Following its release, he began receiving further commissions from other artists.

=== Music video direction ===
Perliks has directed or co-directed music videos for Afrobeats artists like Blaqbonez, Rema, Adekunle Gold, Simi, Falz, Bnxn and Fireboy DML.

His co-directed video for Blaqbonez's "Back in Uni" (2022) was nominated for The Headies Award for Best Music Video at the 16th Headies Awards in 2023. At the 17th Headies Awards in 2025, he received two further nominations in the same category, for Rema's "Charm" (co-directed with Folarin Oludare) and Blaqbonez's "Like Ice Spice" (co-directed with Emeka Shine Shine).

In its year-end list of favourite music videos of 2025, Pulse Nigeria included two videos credited to "Perliks Definition": Adekunle Gold's "Many People" and Shallipopi's "Laho."

== Plastic Angel ==
In 2021, Perliks created Plastic Angel, an environmental art installation intended to draw attention to plastic pollution in Lagos. With the help of more than 100 volunteers, he and his collaborators collected, washed and sorted several thousand pieces of discarded plastic, which were used to construct large angel-wing sculptures and accompanying photographic murals.

The project received coverage from the Indian broadcaster WION, which described Perliks directing a team constructing an angel figure from recycled plastic to highlight environmental harm in Nigeria, and from the CBC Television which reported that he had gathered around 5,000 plastic bottles around Lagos for the project.

== Selected filmography ==
| Year | Title | Artist | Notes |
|---|---|---|---|
| 2020 | "Money Anthem" | Macjreyz | |
| 2022 | "Back in Uni" | Blaqbonez | Co-directed; nominated for The Headies Award for Best Music Video (2023) |
| 2023 | "Charm" | Rema | Co-directed with Folarin Oludare; nominated for The Headies Award for Best Music Video (2025) |
| 2023 | "Yawa" | Fireboy DML | |
| 2024 | "Borrow Me Your Baby" | Simi feat. Falz | |
| 2024 | "Like Ice Spice" | Blaqbonez | Co-directed with Emeka Shine Shine; nominated for The Headies Award for Best Music Video (2025) |
| 2024 | "Say My Name" | Bnxn | |
| 2025 | "Many People" | Adekunle Gold | Included in Pulse Nigeria's year-end list of favourite music videos of 2025 |
| 2025 | "Laho" | Shallipopi | Included in Pulse Nigeria's year-end list of favourite music videos of 2025 |

== Awards and nominations ==
| Year | Award | Category | Work | Result |
|---|---|---|---|---|
| 2023 | The Headies | Best Music Video | "Back in Uni" (Blaqbonez, co-dir.) | Nominated |
| 2025 | The Headies | Best Music Video | "Charm" (Rema, co-dir.) | Nominated |
| 2025 | The Headies | Best Music Video | "Like Ice Spice" (Blaqbonez, co-dir.) | Nominated |
