= Iseoluwa =

Song by Fireboy DML

from the album Adedamola
- Released: 29 August 2024
- Genre: Afrobeats
- Length: 3:18
- Label: YBNL Nation; Empire
- Songwriter: Adedamola Adefolahan
- Producers: Bassiqally; Nxrth

Music video
- "Iseoluwa" on YouTube

"Iseoluwa" (stylized in lowercase) is a song by Nigerian singer Fireboy DML. Produced by Bassiqally and Nxrth, the song is the opening track off Fireboy's eponymous fourth studio album Adedamola (2024).

== Composition and lyrics ==
"Iseoluwa," meaning "the work of God," is the opening track on Adedamola and draws inspiration from Musiliu Haruna Ishola's 2000 release, "Ise Oluwa Ko Seni Toye." The song incorporates talking drums, omele, piano chords, and saxophones, creating a layered instrumental backdrop. Fireboy DML uses the song to express gratitude through lyrics such as "Life has been good to me; I do not take this with levity." The track borrows elements from Apala music, including the folk drums and melodies inspired by Musiliu Haruna Ishola. "Iseoluwa" reflects Fireboy's reflections on his journey as an artist and his gratitude to God, making it a fitting introduction to the album. The stomping gangan and omele, paired with soulful chords, form the core instrumentation of "Iseoluwa." Fireboy's lyrics include "2024, I pray to God, make I no fall o / Bí mo sé n lo, bí mo sé nbò, Olúwa só mí o," which are rooted in themes of faith and gratitude. The song also aligns with the spiritual undertones seen in other YBNL releases, such as Asake's "Suru" and Olamide's "Morowore".

== Critical reception ==
In reviews of Adedamola, "Iseoluwa" received praise for its role as the album's opener. Adeayo Adebiyi of Pulse Nigeria described the track as a reflection of Fireboy DML's gratitude for his career, citing its folk drum instrumentation and inspiration from Musiliu Haruna Ishola's Apala classic. He noted that the song is "rooted in cultural and musical tradition" and opens the project on a note of gratitude."

Hope Ibiale of Afrocritik highlighted the song's layered instrumentation, which includes talking drums, omele, piano chords, and saxophones, and described the track as "engaging and reflective." She also noted its inspiration from Ishola's 2000 classic "Ise Oluwa Ko Seni Toye" and emphasized the song's ear-catching production.

Ademoye Afeez of NotJustOk commended "Iseoluwa" as a groovy yet reflective opening track on Adedamola, highlighting its Yoruba translation as "the wonders of God." He praised the song's elegant introduction, which features the omele (baby talking drum) alongside the gangan (talking drum), creating a calm yet rhythmic Selense or Jenleke vibe. Afeez noted Fireboy DML's swift and focused delivery, expressing gratitude and optimism with lines like, "Life has been good to me; I do not take this with levity." Produced by Bassiqally and Nxrth, the track is enriched by soothing female backup vocals and a standout saxophone performance, which Afeez described as making it "a perfect intro and an instant Fireboy classic." He further applauded the album's cohesive production, crediting experienced creatives like Bassiqally, Nxrth, and ID Cabasa for their contributions. Olukorede Owoeye of Nigerian Entertainment Today described "Iseoluwa" as "one of the best album openers I have heard in a while," praising its thanksgiving and praise-filled lyrics, vibrant energy, and thematic depth. He noted it set the stage for an "interesting album."

== Charts ==
Chart performance for "Iseoluwa"
Chart (2024)	Peak position
Nigeria (TurnTable Top 100)	8
US Afrobeats Songs (Billboard)	23
UK Afrobeats (Official Charts)	9
