= Apollo (Fireboy DML album) =

Studio album by Fireboy DML
- Released: 20 August 2020
- Genre: Afro pop; pop; R&B
- Length: 48:00
- Language: English; Yoruba; Nigerian Pidgin
- Label: YBNL Nation; Empire
- Producer: Pheelz; Type A; IamBeatz; P.Priime

Fireboy DML chronology
Laughter, Tears and Goosebumps (2019)	Apollo (2020)	Playboy (2022)

Singles from Apollo
- 1. "New York City Girl" Released: 22 June 2020; 2. "Eli" Released: 27 July 2020; 3. "Tattoo" Released: 12 August 2020; 4. "Champion" Released: 3 March 2021

Apollo (stylized in all caps) is the second studio album by Nigerian singer and songwriter Fireboy DML. It was released on 20 August 2020 by YBNL Nation and distributed by Empire Distribution. The album featured guest appearances from Olamide, Wande Coal and D Smoke. Fireboy enlisted production from Pheelz, Type A, IamBeatz and P.Priime. The album is a follow-up to his debut, Laughter, Tears and Goosebumps (2019).

== Background ==
In an interview with OkayAfrica, Fireboy DML said he took a break after the release of Laughter, Tears and Goosebumps (2019) to work on a follow-up project, which later became Apollo. He said that the COVID-19 lockdown period did not disrupt his work even though it prevented live performances. He also stated that the album’s title was drawn from the Greek god Apollo, which he said reflects how he views his artistic identity.

== Singles ==
The album's lead single "New York City Girl" was released on 22 June 2020 alongside a Clarence Peters-directed music video. The song was produced by Type A. The second single, "Eli" was released on 27 July 2020 and was produced by Pheelz. The third single, "Tattoo" was released just a week before the album's release on 12 August 2020 alongside its music video which was also directed by Peters. The song was produced by Type A. The Pheelz-produced track "Champion" featuring D Smoke was released as Apollo's fourth single. Its accompanying music video was directed by TG Omori.

== Critical reception ==
Professional ratings
Review scores
Source	Rating
Afrocritik	6.8/10
Pulse Nigeria	7.6/10
Pitchfork	8.3/10

Apollo received positive reviews from critics. Motolani Alake of Pulse Nigeria described Apollo as "more sonically and topically diverse" than his debut, adding that "if Laughter, Tears and Goosebumps was his battle cry… Apollo is his victory parade", and called it "another solid body of work… not exceptional, but very good", rating it 7.6/10. Jerry Chiemeke of Afrocritik said that it "falls short" in production compared to Laughter, Tears and Goosebumps but "the penmanship can hardly be faulted", adding that calling it a "sophomore slump would be reaching", and rated it 6.8/10.

Dennis Ade Peter of The Native described Apollo as "a chance… to start properly building his mythos and legacy", noting its "diverse" but not "ground-breaking" production and added that, despite containing "filler material", Fireboy "overcom[es] the sophomore slump with relative ease". Emmanuel Esomnofu of NotJustOk wrote that Apollo "does not succumb to the slump associated with second albums", calling it "a quality tape” with strong songwriting and introspection, but noted that its "complications with track listing" and uneven transitions affect its structure. Ivie Ani of Pitchfork said Apollo was "easy, exciting, and earnest" with "soothing, feel-good music" built on "simplified songwriting" that "becomes unforgettable", rating it 8.3/10.

=== Accolades ===
Apollo won Best Pop Album and Album of the Year at the fourteenth edition of the Headies.

== Track listing ==
Apollo track listing
No.	Title	Writer(s)	Producer(s)	Length
1.	"Champion" (featuring D Smoke)	Adedamola Adefolahan; Daniel Farris	Pheelz	2:59
2.	"Spell" (featuring Wande Coal)	Adefolahan; Oluwatobi Ojosipe	Pheelz	2:53
3.	"Eli"	Adefolahan	Pheelz	2:52
4.	"Tattoo"	Adefolahan	Type A	2:56
5.	"Favourite Song"	Adefolahan	Pheelz	2:33
6.	"New York City Girl"	Adefolahan	Type A	2:20
7.	"Lifestyle"	Adefolahan	IamBeatz	2:32
8.	"Airplane Mode"	Adefolahan	Type A	2:57
9.	"24" (interlude)	Adefolahan	Pheelz	1:21
10.	"Dreamer"	Adefolahan	Pheelz	3:00
11.	"Afar" (featuring Olamide)	Adefolahan; Olamide Adedeji	IamBeatz	2:51
12.	"Go Away"	Adefolahan	Type A	3:29
13.	"Shadé"	Adefolahan	Type A	3:29
14.	"Friday Feeling"	Adefolahan	Pheelz	2:36
15.	"God Only Knows"	Adefolahan	Pheelz	3:11
16.	"Sound"	Adefolahan	Pheelz	3:27
17.	"Remember Me"	Adefolahan	Pheelz	2:51
Total length:				48:00

== Personnel ==
- Adedamola "Fireboy DML" Adefolahan - vocals, writer
- Daniel "D Smoke" Farris - vocals, writer
- Oluwatobi "Wande Coal" Ojosipe - vocals, writer
- Olamide Adedeji - vocals, writer, executive producer, A&R
- Phillip "Pheelz" Moses - producer, mixing engineer, mastering engineer
- Talabi "IamBeatz" Abraham - producer
- Peace "P.Priime" Oredope - producer
- Kelenna "Type A" Agada - producer
- Temitayo "Tee-Y Mix" Ibitoye - mixing engineer, mastering engineer
- Stephen "STG" Abenga - mixing engineer, mastering engineer
- Niyi Okeowo - photography and creative design

== Charts ==
Chart performance for Apollo
Chart (2022–23)	Peak position
US World Albums (Billboard)	14

== Release history ==
Release history and formats for Apollo
Region	Date	Format	Label
Worldwide	20 August 2020	Streaming; digital download	Empire
Worldwide	11 June 2021	CD	Empire
Worldwide	19 July 2022	LP; vinyl	Empire
