= Twice as Tall =

Studio album by Burna Boy
- Released: 14 August 2020
- Recorded: 2020
- Genres: Afrobeats; Afrobeat; dancehall; pop; hip-hop
- Length: 52:40
- Languages: English; Nigerian Pidgin; Yoruba; Swahili
- Labels: Spaceship; Bad Habit; Atlantic; Warner Music
- Producers: Damini Ogulu (also exec.); Bose Ogulu (also exec.); Sean Combs (also exec.); Timbaland; Matt Testa; DJDS; Matthew Baus; P2J; Mike Dean; LeriQ; Rexxie; Telz; Mario Winans; Skread; Sauti Sol; Andre Harris; JAE5

Burna Boy chronology
| African Giant (2019) | Twice as Tall (2020) | Love, Damini (2022) |

Singles from Twice as Tall
- 1. "Wonderful" Released: 26 June 2020; 2. "Monsters You Made" Released: 14 August 2020; 3. "Real Life" Released: 14 August 2020

Twice as Tall is the fifth studio album by Nigerian singer Burna Boy. It was released on 13 August 2020 by Spaceship Entertainment, Bad Habit, Atlantic Records and Warner Music. Recording sessions took place in 2020, with Burna Boy, American singer and songwriter Diddy and Burna Boy's mother Bose Ogulu serving as the record's executive producers. The album is a mixture of Afrobeats, Afrobeat, dancehall, pop and hip-hop. It was produced primarily by Telz, along with production from Rexxie, Timbaland and DJDS, among others. The album features guest appearances from Youssou N'Dour, Naughty by Nature, Sauti Sol, Chris Martin and Stormzy. Its lead single is "Wonderful", released on 26 June 2020.

At the 63rd ceremony of the Grammy Awards, Twice as Tall won Best Global Music Album.

== Background and recording ==
Burna Boy recorded songs for Twice as Tall mainly in Ahoada, Nigeria over few months of the COVID-19 pandemic in 2020. Due to the pandemic, Burna Boy and his co-executive producer Diddy worked together through virtual file transfers and Zoom calls, the latter providing voice-over intros for a few of the songs and musical input. Burna Boy told The New York Times, "I've never picked up a pen and paper and written down a song in my life. It all just comes, like someone is standing there and telling me what to say. It's all according to the spirits. Some of us are put on this earth to do what we do". He said that through the album, he is building a bridge that leads every black person in the world to come together. Burna Boy said in a press release that the album is about a period of time in his life, "It's the album about the struggle for freedom. It's the album about life in general, real life, good times, bad times, happy times, sad times, great times". The album was produced primarily by Telz, along with production from Rexxie, Timbaland and DJDS, among others. It features guest appearances from Youssou N'Dour, Naughty by Nature, Sauti Sol, Chris Martin and Stormzy.

The album release was accompanied by a comic book The Secret Flame, narrated by Burna Boy's grandfather, Benson Idonije, who managed Afrobeat music pioneer Fela Kuti. The animated comic, follows Burna Boy through a spiritual journey of discovering oneself while highlighting the very moments that brought him to where he is standing tall today. Burna Boy released the album artwork on Instagram, depicting him in cartoon form as a titan, striding over modern roads and ancient monuments. He said that the art did justice to exactly what he intended to portray, noting that it reflects his journey through different energies and emotions while recording the album.

== Composition ==
Twice as Tall is an Afrobeats, Afrobeat, dancehall, pop and hip-hop album. The album opens with Youssou N'Dour-assisted "Level Up", where Burna Boy revisited his sharp rise in popularity, celebrating his achievements and notes his desire for further notoriety. Vulture.com writer Justin Curto praised the song, noting that it's better than a victory lap. "Alarm Clock" beat is a contemporary Afro-pop sound in outlook and is heavily influenced by Fela's Afrobeat era in delivery. It features a spoken intro from the executive producer Diddy. On "Way Too Big", Burna Boy is found in a self-confident form, relaying his intention to avoid bad company as a violin track cushions his vocals. On "Bebo" produced by Rexxie, Burna Boy discussed his desire for authenticity.

"Wonderful" was produced by Telz and sees Burna Boy expressing excitement for his people and the globalization of their unique sound. It was recorded in Nigerian pidgin and Yoruba. In a review for Pitchfork, Mankaprr Conteh praised the song's production and said "the singer revels in the alchemy of rhythm and hustle. He's mystified by what beats and drums can conjure, the way they spread joy and spark motion from your toes to your scalp". "Onyeka" produced by Telz, is a happy and triumphant tune. In the Naughty by Nature-assisted track "Naughty by Nature", Burna Boy talked about the journey to where he is now, admitting his dislike for politics. "Comma" has a danceable beat. The LeriQ-produced track "No Fit Vex" sees Burna Boy dishing out positive twists, saying he is now a man who is less interested in his petulant side. "23", features a piano-assisted instrumental. Burna Boy sees himself similar to Basketball legend Michael Jordan. "Time Flies" interpolates Marc Anthony's "I Need You". It features vocals from Sauti Sol with a spoken outro from Burna Boy's mother Bose Ogulu.

The politically charged Reggae-Fusion track "Monsters you Made" explores the historical injustices on an oppressed race that's convinced enough should be enough, addressing African and African-American experiences with prejudice, touching on subjects like slavery and miseducation. The song is full of pain, anger and plenty of defiances, featuring vocals from Chris Martin with a spoken outro from Ghanaian author and poet Ama Ata Aidoo. In "Wetin Dey Sup", Burna Boy speaks against gun violence and police brutality. The Stormzy-assisted track "Real Life" contains a sample of T-Pain's "I'm Sprung" and sees Stormzy crooning in true R&B style, with the aid of a vocoder. In "Bank On It", Burna Boy asks for forgiveness if he fails and for protection from his enemies. He is aided by his belief in a supreme being and deferred to faith in the face of a potential detraction. The song climaxes with a choir harmonizing the main hook.

== Promotion ==
On 21 February 2020, Burna Boy announced he would embark on the Twice as Tall World tour beginning on 7 May 2020 in Atlanta, Georgia and ending on 30 August 2020 in Oberhausen, Germany. The tour ended up not happening due to the COVID-19 pandemic.

== Singles ==
"Wonderful" was released as the album's lead single on 26 June 2020. The accompanying music video was released on 30 June 2020 and was directed by Director K; it depicts old African ways. In it, Burna Boy is seen lying asleep on a palm frond, somewhere in the land of warriors, kings and queens, he is then woken from his drowse by a gorilla and ambushed by some warriors dressed in traditional attire, before turning into a celebration where both the warriors and the singer began dancing. Burna Boy is dressed as a warrior and hailed a champion. Upon the release of the song, Burna Boy said "This song is about the wonders of seeing the impact of my music on people's lives as they shared their joy, pain and pleasure with me while I toured the world".

"Monsters You Made" was released as the album's second single on 28 August 2020. The accompanying music video, shows the theme of how systematic racism and inequality leads to trauma and violence.

"Real Life" was released as the album's third single on 2 October 2020. The accompanying music video, which was released on the same day, was directed by Meji Aladi and featured British rapper Stormzy. The video depicts the realities of crime.

== Reception ==
Professional ratings
Aggregate scores
| Source | Rating |
|---|---|
| AnyDecentMusic? | 6.9/10 |
| Metacritic | 79/100 |
Review scores
| Source | Rating |
| The Daily Telegraph | 4/5 stars |
| The Guardian | 4/5 stars |
| Naijagig | 4.5/5 stars |
| NativeMag | 8.2/10 |
| NME | 3/5 stars |
| Pitchfork | 8.0/10 |
| Pulse Nigeria | 8.7/10 |
| Tom Hull – on the Web | B+ |

Twice as Tall received generally favourable reviews from music critics. At Metacritic, which assigns a weighted average rating out of 100 to reviews from mainstream publications, this release received an average score of 79 based on six reviews. Pitchfork's Mankaprr Conteh gave the album 8.0 out of 10 rating, describing it as massive and noting that "society could use a hero, a godsend". Motolani Alake of Pulse Nigeria assigned a rating of 8.7 out of 10, praising the singer's work ethic and stating that the album is amazing. Alake said the album is a "commendable and exceptional third straight album from the singer", while noting that "everything that made African Giant great is on Twice as Tall". Nicolas-Tyrell Scott of NME rated the album three stars out of five, characterizing it "as a satisfying sequel." He further said: "It's admirable to see him balance his signature sound with hints of exploration in collaborations such as "Monsters You Made", all while remaining true to his mother tongue". Writing for Meaww, Jenifer Gonsalves said the album is "a solid album from Burna Boy, one that establishes him as an artiste capable of blending sounds, styles and cultures to create music that encompasses a better world".

Lloyd Bradley of The Guardian awarded the album four stars out of five, noting that "the album positions African music in the 21st century by using contemporary sounds for traditional melodies and rhythms". The Daily Telegraph's Pritchard Will gave the album four stars out of five, saying "if Twice as Tall is the singer's bid for global superstardom, then the music is polished to befit his aims". In a review for Mail & Guardian, Kwanele Sosibo stated that "there's lots of sheen and polish on the album, with each song, it seems, staking its own fresh claim on the sonic palette that constitutes Afrobeats". Kunle Adesokan of Naijagig awarded the album a rating of 4.5 out of 5, noting that "if anything, Burna Boy has grown twice as tall from the man and artiste that recorded the African Giant album. Kunle added: "by using contemporary sounds for traditional melodies and drawing on various musical styles while staying true to African sounds, Burna Boy defines what modern African music should be."

=== Accolades ===
Accolades for Twice as Tall
| Publication | Accolade | Rank |
|---|---|---|
| Bay Eight | Eight Albums You Need To Hear Before The Year Ends | N/A |
| Bounce Radio Live | The 50 Best African Albums of 2020 | 1 |
| Consequence of Sound | Top 50 Albums of 2020 | 37 |
| The Fader | The 50 Best Albums of 2020 | 23 |
| Genius | The 50 Best Albums of 2020 | 41 |
| British GQ | The 24 Best Albums of 2020 | 16 |
| The Gryphon | The Gryphon's favourite albums of 2020 | N/A |
| HipHopDX | Best R&B Albums of 2020 | 41 |
| The Line of Best Fit | Top 50 Albums of 2020 | 41 |
| Native Mag | The 20 Best Albums of 2020 | 2 |
| The New York Times | Top 10 Albums of 2020 | 7 |
| NJ.com | The 50 Albums that saved us from 2020 | 24 |
| NME | The 50 Best Albums of 2020 | 23 |
| Pan African Music | Best Albums of 2020 | N/A |
| Passion of the Weiss | The POW Best Albums of 2020 | 12 |
| Pitchfork | The 50 Best Albums of 2020 | 46 |
| Uproxx | Top 50 Albums of 2020 | 44 |
| Vice | The 100 Best Albums of 2020 | 21 |
| Vogue India | The 20 Best Albums of 2020 | 8 |

== Track listing ==
Twice as Tall track listing
| No. | Title | Writer(s) | Producer(s) | Length |
|---|---|---|---|---|
| 1. | "Level Up" (featuring Youssou N'Dour) | Damini Ogulu; Youssou N'Dour | Timbaland; Matt Testa; DJDS; Matthew Baus | 4:28 |
| 2. | "Alarm Clock" | Ogulu | Diddy; Timbaland; P2J | 2:12 |
| 3. | "Way Too Big" | Ogulu | Diddy; Timbaland; Mike Dean; LeriQ | 3:20 |
| 4. | "Bebo" | Ogulu | Rexxie | 2:44 |
| 5. | "Wonderful" | Ogulu | Telz | 3:33 |
| 6. | "Onyeka" | Ogulu | Telz | 3:22 |
| 7. | "Naughty by Nature" (featuring Naughty by Nature) | Ogulu; Anthony Criss; Vin Rock | Diddy; Mario Winans; Telz | 3:34 |
| 8. | "Comma" | Ogulu | Rexxie | 2:50 |
| 9. | "No Fit Vex" | Ogulu | LeriQ | 3:41 |
| 10. | "23" | Ogulu | Skread | 4:05 |
| 11. | "Time Flies" (featuring Sauti Sol) | Ogulu; Benson Mutua; Willis Austin Chimano; Polycarp Otieno; Bien-Aimé Baraza; Savara Mudigi | Sauti Sol; Andre Harris | 3:44 |
| 12. | "Monsters You Made" (featuring Chris Martin) | Ogulu; Chris Martin | LeriQ | 3:37 |
| 13. | "Wetin Dey Sup" | Ogulu | Timbaland; Telz | 3:37 |
| 14. | "Real Life" (featuring Stormzy) | Ogulu; Michael Omari | Mario Winans; Telz | 3:16 |
| 15. | "Bank On It" | Ogulu | Jae5 | 4:36 |
| Total length: | | | | 52:40 |

Sample credits

- "Real Life" contains a sample of "I'm Sprung", performed by T-Pain.
- "Time Flies" contains an interpolation of "I Need You", performed by Marc Anthony.

== Personnel ==
Vocalists

- Burna Boy – primary artist
- Youssou N'Dour – featured artist (1)
- Naughty by Nature – featured artist (7)
- Sauti Sol – featured artist (11)
- Chris Martin – featured artist (12)
- Stormzy – featured artist (14)

Production

- Telz – production (5–6), co-production (7, 14)
- Rexxie – production (4, 8)
- Diddy – co-production (2, 3, 7)
- LeriQ – production (9, 12), co-production (3)
- Timbaland – co-production (1, 2, 3, 13)
- Mario Winans – co-production (7, 14)
- Skread – production (10)
- JAE5 – production (15)
- Matt Testa – co-production (1)
- DJDS – co-production (1)
- Matthew Baus – co-production (1)
- P2J – co-production (2)
- Mike Dean – co-production (3)
- Sauti Sol – co-production (11)
- Andre Harris – co-production (11)

== Charts ==
Chart performance for Twice as Tall
| Chart (2020–2022) | Peak positions |
|---|---|
| Austrian Albums (Ö3 Austria) | 69 |
| Belgian Albums (Ultratop Flanders) | 22 |
| Belgian Albums (Ultratop Wallonia) | 22 |
| Canadian Albums (Billboard) | 19 |
| Dutch Albums (Album Top 100) | 10 |
| French Albums (SNEP) | 29 |
| Irish Albums (Official Charts) | 31 |
| Nigerian Albums (TurnTable) | 25 |
| Norwegian Albums (VG-lista) | 34 |
| Swedish Albums (Sverigetopplistan) | 47 |
| Swiss Albums (Schweizer Hitparade) | 12 |
| UK Albums (Official Charts) | 11 |
| US Billboard 200 | 54 |
| US World Albums (Billboard) | 1 |

== Release history ==
Release history for Twice as Tall
| Region | Date | Format | Label | Ref |
|---|---|---|---|---|
| Various | 14 August 2020 | CD; vinyl; digital download; streaming | Bad Habit; Spaceship; Atlantic; Warner Music | |

== Certifications ==
Certifications for Twice As Tall
| Region | Certification | Certified units/sales |
|---|---|---|
| United Kingdom (BPI) | Silver | 60,000^{‡} |
^{‡} Sales+streaming figures based on certification alone.
