= P.Priime =

Nigerian record producer and songwriter

- Also known as: Big P
- Born: Peace Aderogba Oredope; 28 March 2002 (age 24)
- Genres: Afrobeats; RnB; Hip hop
- Occupations: Record producer, songwriter
- Instruments: Drums; piano; guitar

Peace Emmanuel Aderogba Oredope (born 28 March 2002), professionally known as P.Priime (Big P), is a Nigerian record producer, DJ, music director, mixing engineer and songwriter.

P.Priime known for the production of "Anoti" a song on Wizkid's Grammy-nominated album Made in Lagos and three of the tracks from Black Panther: Wakanda Forever - "Anya Mmiri" by CKay ft. PinkPantheress, "Alone" by Burna Boy, and "Coming Back For You" by Fireboy DML.

He is otherwise known for the sound tag "P", "Giddem", at the beginning or end of all his productions.

== Career ==
P.Priime has produced some hit singles like "Ozumba Mbadiwe" by Reekado Banks, and "Bandana" by Fireboy DML ft. Asake, "Electricity" by Davido and Pheelz, "Loading" by Olamide ft. Bad Boy Timz and many more.

He co-produced Wizkid's Made In Lagos: Deluxe Edition Album, Aṣa's V Album, and 7 out of 10 songs on Olamide's album which gave him more recognition in the music industry – Carpe Diem.

P.Priime was a member of the 2018 Sarz Academy. In 2021, he was nominated for producer of the year at the AFRIMMA Awards and won. YouTube also announced P.Priime as one of the two Nigerian Producers for YouTube Black Voices Songwriter/Producer Class of 2022.

Beyond music, P. Priime loves modeling and has walked the runway for Elfreda Kahlo at the Lagos Fashion Week 2021.

== Biography ==
Born in Lagos state, into a family of choristers, P.Priime began playing drums at age 4 and mastering the piano at the age of 8. He also plays the saxophone and guitar.

He attended Nuga Paul High School, Ejigbo, Lagos. After graduation, he attended a summer school at the Musical Society of Nigeria Centre.

== Awards and nominations ==
P.Priime's contributions to the Nigerian music industry have earned him recognition in various award shows and events including the Best Global Music Album category in the 64th Annual Grammy Awards for Wizkid's Made in Lagos: Deluxe Edition.

Year	Event	Prize	Recipient	Result	Reference
2022	Grammy Awards	Best Global Music Album	Made in Lagos (Deluxe Edition) - Wizkid	Nominated	
2022	The Headies 2022	Producer of the Year	Himself	Nominated	
2022	The Headies 2022	Album of the year	Carpe Diem	Nominated	
2022	The Headies 2022	Headies Viewer's Choice	"Infinity" – ft. Omah Lay	Nominated	
2022	The Headies 2022	Best rap album	Carpe Diem	Won	
2022	The Headies 2022	Best rap single	Olamide ft Bad Boy Timz	Nominated	
2022	Clout Africa Awards 2022	Producer of the Year	Himself	Won	
2021	African Music Magazine Awards	Best Music Producer	Himself	Won	
2021	All Africa Music Awards	Producer of the Year	P.Priime (for "Infinity" – Olamide ft. Omah Lay)	Nominated	
2021	All Africa Music Awards	Album of the year	Carpe Diem	Nominated	
2021	All Africa Music Awards	Song of the Year	"Infinity" – Olamide ft. Omah Lay	Nominated	
2021	Net Honours	Most Played Hip Hop Song	"Loading" – ft. Bad Boy Timz	Nominated	
2021	The Beatz Awards	Afro Beat Producer of the Year	P.Priime (for "Anoti" - Wizkid)	Won	
2020	The Headies	Best R&B Album	"Tears, Laughter & Goosebumps"	Won	
2020	The Headies	Album of the Year	"Apollo"	Won	
2020	The Headies	Best Pop Album	"Apollo"	Won	
2020	AVA Awards	Producer of the Year	Himself	Won	

== Production discography ==
Year	Song title	Artiste
2023	"DND"	Rema
2023	"Don't Leave"	Rema
2022	"Pressure"	Wizkid
2022	"Alone"	Burna Boy
2022	"Anya Mmiri"	CKay ft. PinkPantheress
2022	"Coming Back For You"	Fireboy DML
2022	"Ase"	Bella Shmurda
2022	"Bandana"	Fireboy DML ft .Asake
2022	"Electricity"	Davido and Pheelz
2022	"Bad Girl"	DJ Tunez ft. Wande Coal and Victory
2022	"LET YOU DOWN"	Wurld
2022	"Majo"	DJ Tunez ft. Wizkid, Alpha P, and Tay Iwar
2022	"Leader"	Lojay
2022	"Having Fun"	Fireboy DML
2022	"Adore"	Fireboy DML ft. Euro
2022	"Likkle Riddim"	Joeboy
2022	"Better"	Kaestyle
2022	"Something"	Gyakie
2022	"Nobody"	Simi
2022	"Naked Wire"	Simi
2022	"Woman"	Omah Lay
2022	"I Wanna Run Away"	R3HAB, Mr. Eazi and Wafia
2022	"Wanna Know"	Terri
2022	"Apollo"	Victony
2022	"All I Ever Wanted"	Aṣa ft. Amaarae
2022	"Believer"	Aṣa
2022	"Morning Man"	Aṣa
2022	"Show Me Off"	Aṣa
2022	"Nike"	Aṣa
2022	"Mayana"	Aṣa
2022	"Ocean"	Aṣa
2022	"IDG"	Aṣa ft. Wizkid
2022	"Love Me Or Give Me Red Wine"	Aṣa
2022	"Yard"	Poco Lee f. Bella Shmurda, Alpha P, and Black Sherif
2022	"Hate Me"	Olamide ft. Wande Coal
2022	"Ozumba Mbadiwe"	Reekado Banks ft. Fireboy DML [Remix]
2022	"Ozumba Mbadiwe"	Reekado Banks ft. KiDi [Remix]
2022	"Ozumba Mbadiwe"	Reekado Banks ft. Rayvanny [Remix]
2022	"Ozumba Mbadiwe"	Reekado Banks ft. Lady Du [Remix]
2022	"Ozumba Mbadiwe"	Reekado Banks ft. Elow'n [Remix]
2021	"Anoti"	Wizkid
2021	"Come Around"	Terri
2021	"ZaZoo Zehh"	Poco Lee ft. Olamide and Portable
2021	"I Wanna Run Away"	R3HAB, Mr. Eazi and Wafia
2021	"Lupita Nyongo"	Reekado Banks
2021	"Mama Mia"	Jaido P ft .Joeboy
2021	"Energy"	Zlatan ft. Rayvanny and Sho Madjozi
2021	"Fada"	Zlatan ft. Phyno and Flavour
2021	"Egun"	Zlatan Ibile
2021	"Play"	Oladapo
2021	"Alone"	Oladapo
2021	"Need For Speed"	Olamide
2021	"Cho Cho"	Zlatan ft. Davido and Mayorkun
2021	"Change Your Style"	Peruzzi ft. Boylexxy
2021	BLACK (BONUS TRACK)	Teni
2021	DADS SONG	Teni
2021	"JO"	Teni
2021	"100 METERS"	Teni
2021	"TOXIC"	Teni
2021	Mainland to Island	Ola Dips and Zlatan
2021	"Better Better"	Jamopyper
2021	"Better Better (Remix)"	Jamopyper ft. David
2021	"Original (Remix)"	Gbasky ft. Moelogo
2021	"Southy Love"	Peruzzi ft. Fireboy DML
2021	"Wambi"	Yetty Gold ft. Zlatan
2021	"Lagos Anthem (Remix)"	Zlatan Ibile ft. Frescool, Oladips, Oberz, Kabex & Trod
2021	"Keresimesi"	MerryGo Kids ft Teni
2021	"Mama"	MerryGo Kids ft Teni
2020	"Loading"	Olamide ft. Bad Boy Timz
2020	"Egungun Be Careful"	Obesere and Zlatan
2020	"God Only Knows"	Fireboy DML
2020	"Unripe Pawpaw"	Zlatan, Papisnoop, Oberz and Jamopyper
2020	"Blessed To Have You"	Ceeza Milli
2020	"Bolanle"	Gbasky
2020	"Original"	Gbasky
2020	"Fly Away"	Gbasky
2020	"Stress"	Gbasky
2020	"Puella"	Jahblend
2020	"Black on Black"	Jahblend
2020	"Mine"	Teni
2020	"Good Loving"	P.Priime, Ric Hassani, and Jeff Akoh
2020	"Shomo"	Zlatan ft. Jamopyper, Oberz, and Papisnoop
2020	"Koshi"	Moelogo
2020	"For You"	Moelogo
2020	"Jericho"	The Kazez
2020	"Feel Good"	DJ Cuppy ft. Fireboy DML
2020	"Eru"	Olamide
2020	"Shilalo"	Olamide ft. Phyno
2020	"Another Level"	Olamide
2020	"Infinity"	Olamide ft. Omah Lay
2020	"Chimichanga"	Olamide
2020	"Green Light"	Olamide
2020	"Ozumba Mbadiwe"	Reekado Banks
2020	"Come and See"	P.Priime ft Teni
2020	"Logo's Prayer"	Moelogo
2020	"Mumidani"	Moelogo
2020	"Blessed 2 Have You"	Ceeza Milli
2020	"Require"	DJ Tunez ft Olamide
2020	"Gegeti"	DJ Xclusive, Asake, and Young Jonn
2020	"The Nigerian National Anthem"	MerryGo Kids ft. Immaculate Dache & P.Priime
2020	"Proud"	Oladapo
2020	"Dance"	Oladapo
2020	"Isolate"	Teni
2020	"Wanneka Woman Anthem"	Teni
2020	"Lagos Anthem"	Zlatan
2020	"D4DM"	GoodGirl LA
2020	"Jeje"	GoodGirl LA
2019	"Like I Do"	Fireboy DML
2019	"Gelato"	DJ Cuppy ft. Zlatan
2019	"If You No Know"	Zlatan, Papisnoop, and Jamopyper
2019	"Sunita"	Zlatan Ibile
2019	"Mariba"	Sexy Steel
2019	"Compulsory Course"	Zlatan
2019	"Nobody"	Lyn
2019	"Fly Away"	Gbasky
2019	"Talo Lomo"	GoodGirl LA & Terri
2019	"Pina"	GoodGirl LA
2019	"Greatest"	GoodGirl LA
2019	"E Sure"	GoodGirl LA
2019	"Inspire You"	GoodGirl LA
2018	"Ma Lo Wa"	The Sarz Academy

Radio Jingles	Artiste
Glo Jingle	P.Priime
Wanneka Hair Jingle	P.Priime
Oraimo Jingle	P.Priime
Sterling Bank Jingle	P.Priime

== Filmography ==
Television:

- pile of Up! (2005)
