= Peru (song) =

2021 single by Fireboy DML

Single by Fireboy DML

from the album Playboy
- Released: 20 July 2021
- Genre: Afrobeats
- Length: 2:31
- Label: YBNL Nation; Empire
- Songwriters: Fireboy DML; Ivory Scott IV; Kolten Perine
- Producers: Shizzi & Kolten "SippiBoy" Perine

Fireboy DML singles chronology
"Champion" (2020)	"Peru" (2021)	"Frozen (Remix)" (2022)

Music video
- "Peru" on YouTube

"Peru"

Single by Fireboy DML and Ed Sheeran

from the album Playboy and = (Tour Edition)
- Released: 24 December 2021
- Genre: Afrobeats
- Length: 3:07
- Label: Island; Empire
- Songwriters: Fireboy DML; Ivory Scott IV; Ed Sheeran; Kolten Perine
- Producers: Shizzi & Kolten "SippiBoy" Perine

Ed Sheeran singles chronology
"Sausage Rolls for Everyone" (2021)	"Peru" (2021)	"The Joker and the Queen" (2022)

Music video
- "Peru" on YouTube

"Peru - Remix"

Single by Fireboy DML, 21 Savage, and Blxst
- Released: 11 February 2022
- Genre: Afrobeats
- Length: 3:06
- Songwriter: Fireboy DML

"Peru" is a song by Nigerian singer Fireboy DML. It was released on 20 July 2021, through YBNL Nation, and distributed by Empire. "Peru" was written by Fireboy DML, Ivory Scott, & Kolten Perine and produced by Shizzi & Perine. On 23 December 2021, a reworked version of "Peru" was released, in collaboration with English singer-songwriter Ed Sheeran. The music video for the version with Sheeran was released on 24 December 2021. An additional remix, featuring rappers 21 Savage and Blxst was also later released. The song was nominated at the 7th annual African Entertainment Awards USA for Song of the Year. The song is not about the country of Peru, but rather a reference to Nigerian singer Peruzzi; the government of Peru nonetheless reacted positively to the song on Twitter.

== Background ==
After the song garnered popularity and reached number one on the UK Afrobeats Singles Chart, Fireboy reached out to Sheeran for a remix through the founder of SB.TV, Jamal Edwards. On 11 February 2022, he released the official remix of "Peru", with featured vocals from 21 Savage and Blxst, through Empire Distribution for YBNL Nation.

== Music video ==
On 6 August 2021, Fireboy released the music video for "Peru". The visual sees Fireboy lounging around the streets of the US, seen in the studio, skydiving and trying out dishes. The visual was directed by Mariano Valentino, with additional footage shot by Dakota Lim, and Diego Pina. The visual was edited by Ryan Corr. The new version, music video featuring Ed Sheeran, was released on 24 December 2021. Directed by Gabriella Kingsley, and shot in London, United Kingdom. The music video reached 1.9 million views, less than 24 hours after its releases. On 21 December 2021, Fireboy shared a short clip on his social platforms, singing "Peru" with Sheeran.

== Accolades ==
Year	Organization	Award	Result	Ref.
2021	African Entertainment Awards USA	Song of the Year	Nominated	
2021	NAACP Image Awards	Outstanding International Song	Nominated	
2022	The Headies	Best Afrobeats Single of the Year	Won	
2022	The Headies	Song of the Year	Nominated	
2022	The Headies	Songwriter of the Year	Nominated	
2022	The Headies	Viewer's Choice	Nominated	
2022	All Africa Music Awards	Song of the Year	Nominated	
2022	All Africa Music Awards	Best Male Artiste in West Africa (Fireboy DML for "Peru")	Nominated	
2022	All Africa Music Awards	Artiste of the Year (Fireboy DML for "Peru")	Nominated	
2022	All Africa Music Awards	Best African Collaboration	Nominated	
2022	All Africa Music Awards	Producer of the Year (Shizzi for "Peru")	Won	
2022	NRJ Music Awards	International Collaboration of the Year	Nominated	
2023	Trace Awards & Festival	Song of the Year	Nominated	
2023	Trace Awards & Festival	Best Collaboration	Nominated	
2023	Urban Music Awards	Best Collaboration	Won	
2023	BMI London Awards	Most Performed Song of the Year	Won	
2023	Brit Awards	International Song of the Year	Won	
2023	Global Awards	Best Song	Nominated	

== Commercial performance ==
"Peru" peaked at number two on the UK Singles Chart, and number one on UK Afrobeats Singles Chart. It would eventually spend 22 consecutive weeks in the top 10, tying "Shape of You" and "Bad Habits" as Sheeran's longest-charting songs in the top 10. On 2 August, it debuted at number ten on the TurnTable Top 50. On 4 August, the song peaked at number 14 on the TurnTable Top 50 Airplay chart. On the same day, it peaked at number five on TurnTable Top 50 streaming songs chart. On 26 August, "Peru" peaked at number 26 on TurnTable TV Top songs chart. It was named on the Apple Music Top Songs of 2021 in Nigeria. "Peru" is Fireboy's most popular record with over 20.6 million Spotify streams as of December 2021.

== Track listing ==
- Digital download and streaming
1. "Peru" – 2:31
- Digital download, streaming and CD single
1. "Peru" (with Ed Sheeran) – 3:07
- Digital download and streaming
1. "Peru" (Acoustic) (with Ed Sheeran) – 2:52
- Digital download and streaming
1. "Peru" (Remix) (with 21 Savage and Blxst) – 3:06
- Digital download and streaming
1. "Peru" (R3hab Remix) (with Ed Sheeran) – 2:29

== Charts ==
=== Weekly charts ===
Chart (2021–2022)	Peak position
Canada Hot 100 (Billboard)	37
Canada CHR/Top 40 (Billboard)	24
Euro Digital Song Sales (Billboard)	12
France (SNEP)	28
Global 200 (Billboard)	34
Hungary (Single Top 40)	27
Ireland (IRMA)	7
Luxembourg (Billboard)	19
Netherlands (Dutch Top 40)	21
Netherlands (Single Top 100)	11
New Zealand Hot Singles (RMNZ)	3
South Africa Streaming (TOSAC)	29
Suriname (Nationale Top 40)	2
Sweden (Sverigetopplistan)	35
Switzerland (Schweizer Hitparade)	31
UK Singles (Official Charts)	2
UK Indie (Official Charts)	13
UK Hip Hop/R&B (Official Charts)	1
US Billboard Hot 100	53
US Afrobeats Songs (Billboard)	1
US Hot R&B/Hip-Hop Songs (Billboard)	11
US Pop Airplay (Billboard)	22
US Rhythmic Airplay (Billboard)	5
US World Digital Song Sales (Billboard)	1

=== Year-end charts ===
Chart (2022)	Position
Belgium (Ultratop 50 Flanders)	166
Belgium (Ultratop 50 Wallonia)	117
Canada (Canadian Hot 100)	87
Denmark (Tracklisten)	97
Global 200 (Billboard)	102
Netherlands (Dutch Top 40)	88
Netherlands (Single Top 100)	19
Switzerland (Schweizer Hitparade)	57
UK Singles (OCC)	3
US Afrobeats Songs (Billboard)	2
US Hot R&B/Hip-Hop Songs (Billboard)	34
US Rhythmic (Billboard)	20

== Certifications ==
Region	Certification	Certified units/sales
Denmark (IFPI Danmark) Ed Sheeran version	Platinum	90,000^{‡}
France (SNEP) Ed Sheeran version	Diamond	333,333^{‡}
New Zealand (RMNZ)	Platinum	30,000^{‡}
Nigeria (TCSN) Ed Sheeran version	3× Platinum	300,000^{‡}
United Kingdom (BPI) Ed Sheeran version	3× Platinum	1,800,000^{‡}
United States (RIAA)	Platinum	1,000,000^{‡}
^{‡} Sales+streaming figures based on certification alone.

== Release history ==
Region	Date	Format	Version	Label	Ref.
Various	20 July 2021	Digital download; streaming	Original	YBNL Nation; Empire	
Various	24 December 2021	Digital download; streaming	with Ed Sheeran	YBNL Nation; Empire	
United States	18 January 2022	Rhythmic contemporary radio	with Ed Sheeran	YBNL Nation; Empire	
United Kingdom	21 January 2022	CD single (first pressing)	with Ed Sheeran	YBNL Nation; Empire	
Various	22 January 2022	Digital download; streaming	Acoustic with Ed Sheeran	YBNL Nation; Empire	
Various	11 February 2022	Digital download; streaming	Remix with 22 Savage and Blxst	YBNL Nation; Empire	
United States	15 February 2022	Contemporary hit radio	with Ed Sheeran	YBNL Nation; Empire	
Various	2 March 2022	Digital download; streaming	R3hab Remix with Ed Sheeran	YBNL Nation; Empire	
United Kingdom	11 March 2022	CD single (second pressing)	with Ed Sheeran	YBNL Nation; Empire	
