= D Smoke =

American rapper (born 1985)

- Born: Daniel Anthony Farris; October 17, 1985 (age 40); Inglewood, California, U.S.
- Genre: Hip hop
- Occupations: Rapper; singer; songwriter; actor; educator
- Years active: 2006–present
- Labels: Death Row; gamma.; Woodworks; EMPIRE
- Website: dsmokemusic.com

Daniel Anthony Farris (born October 17, 1985), known professionally as D Smoke, is an American rapper and former educator from Inglewood, California. He first became known as the winner of the Netflix hip hop-based reality competition series Rhythm + Flow in 2019. The following year, he independently released his debut studio album Black Habits (2020), which earned him nominations for Best Rap Album and Best New Artist at the 63rd Annual Grammy Awards. In 2023, he signed with Snoop Dogg's Death Row Records.

== Career ==
Farris grew up in a musical family with his mother, brothers, and cousin being gospel singers in Inglewood, California. His mother was a backup singer for Tina Turner. In 2006, he formed the songwriting group WoodWorks with his brothers and his cousin Tiffany Gouché, who wrote songs for Ginuwine and The Pussycat Dolls, and is credited for co-writing "Never" by Jaheim. He was also in a musical trio with his brother called N3D. On May 9, 2006, he released his first album called Producer of the Year. In 2015, he appeared on SiR's independent album Seven Sundays on the song "You Ain't Ready".

In 2019, Farris was a contestant on the Netflix competition show Rhythm + Flow, and was named the inaugural winner of the three-week series. On October 24, he released his debut extended play, Inglewood High, a 7-track project including a feature from Gouché. HipHopDX gave the EP a positive review, saying he could "utilize multiple flows, deliver introspective storytelling, could rap in Spanish incredibly well and had an ear for quality." He performed at the 2019 Soul Train Music Awards with SiR. He also appeared on the Game's 2019 album Born 2 Rap on its song "Cross on Jesus Back".

D Smoke later appeared as himself in the Peacock series Bel-Air, in the episode "PA to LA", based on The Fresh Prince of Bel-Air. He also starred in Paramount series Mayor of Kingstown.

== Personal life ==
Born to mother Jackie Gouche' and father Ronald Farris which together had 3 boys. One of his brothers, SiR signed with Top Dawg Entertainment in 2017.

Farris graduated from UCLA and was a Spanish and music theory teacher at Inglewood High School.

== Discography ==
=== Studio albums ===
| Title | Album details |
|---|---|
| Producer of the Year | Released: May 9, 2006; Label: Woodworks Records; Format: Digital download |
| Black Habits | Released: February 7, 2020; Label: Woodworks Records, Empire; Format: Streaming, digital download |
| War & Wonders | Released: September 24, 2021; Label: Woodworks Records, Empire; Format: Streaming, digital download |

=== Extended plays ===
| Title | Album details |
|---|---|
| Inglewood High | Released: October 24, 2019; Label: Woodworks Records.; Format: Streaming, digital download. |

=== Guest appearances ===
List of non-single guest appearances, with other performing artists, showing year released and album name
| Title | Year | Other artist(s) | Album |
|---|---|---|---|
| "You Ain't Ready" | 2015 | SiR | Seven Sundays |
| "Painkillers" | 2017 | Davion Farris | Trenier |
| "City Boy" | 2017 | Sha'leah Nikole | The Queen Issue |
| "Cross on Jesus Back" | 2019 | The Game | Born 2 Rap |
| "Champ" | 2020 | Fireboy DML | Apollo |
| "HEADSHOTS" | 2020 | Tobe Nwigwe | CINCOriginals |
| "Rhythm Kitchen" | 2021 | Rare Americans | Jamesy Boy & The Screw Loose Zoo |
| "Can You Hear Me Now?" | 2023 | Lecrae | Church Clothes 4: Dry Clean Only |
| "Bet on Me" | 2023 | Walk Off the Earth | Stand by You |
| "Box of Stars Pt. 1" | 2024 | Jacob Collier | Djesse Vol. 4 |

== Awards and nominations ==
| Organization | Year | Category | Nominee/work | Result | Ref. |
|---|---|---|---|---|---|
| Grammy Awards | 2021 | Best New Artist | D Smoke | Nominated | |
| Grammy Awards | 2021 | Best Rap Album | Black Habits | Nominated | |
| NAACP Image Awards | 2021 | Outstanding New Artist | D Smoke | Nominated | |
| Pop Awards | 2021 | Music Video of the Year | "Black Habits I" | Nominated | |
