= Director K =

Nigerian music video director (born 1993)

Dulsé
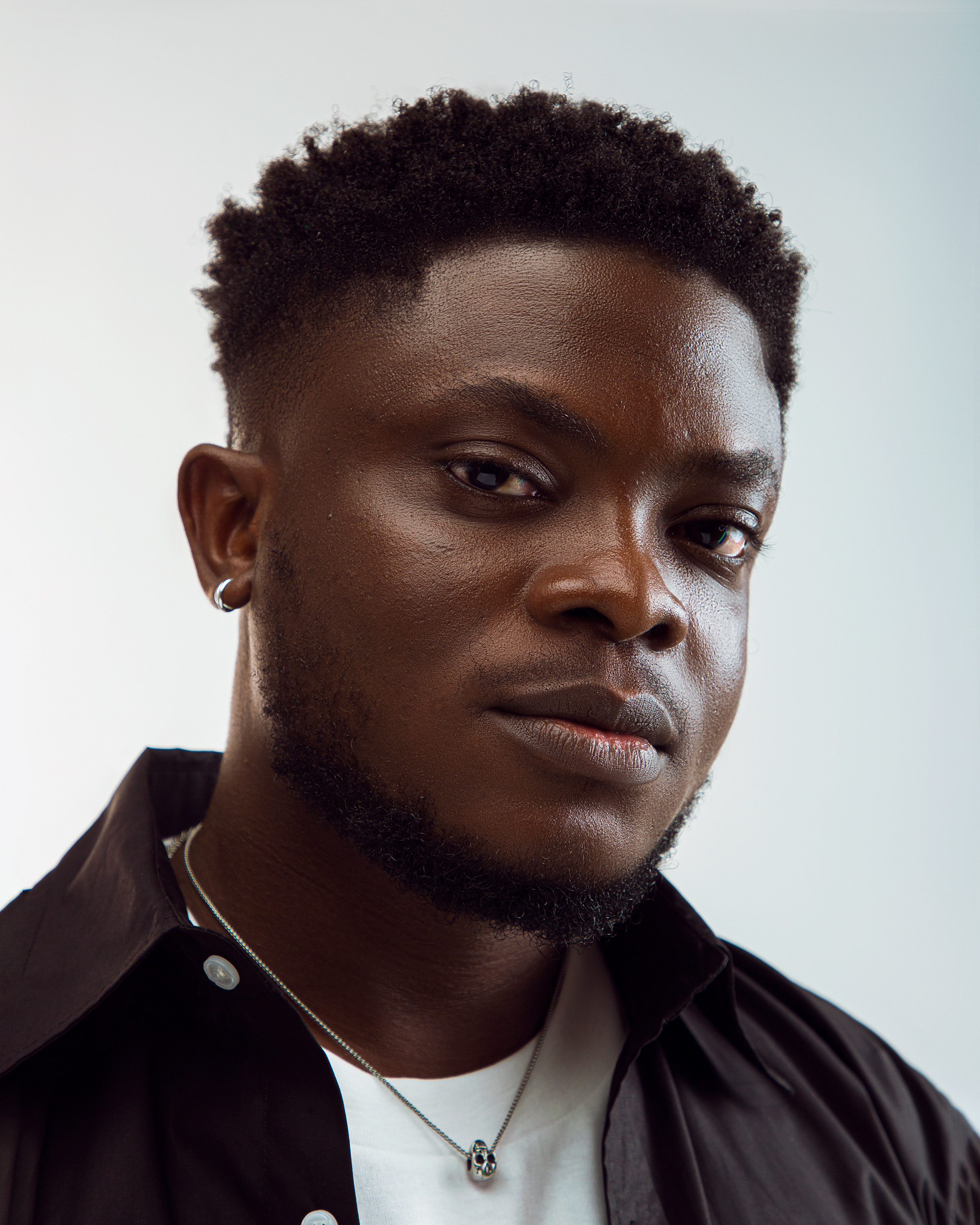

Background information
- Also known as: DK
- Born: Aremu Olaiwola Qudus; 13 November 1993 (age 32); Lagos, Nigeria
- Occupations: Filmmaker, music video director
- Years active: 2018–Present
- Website: priorgoldpictures.com

Dulsé,(born 13 November 1993) formerly known professionally as Director K, is a Nigerian filmmaker and music video director. He is known for directing music videos for artists including Rema, Wizkid, Burna Boy, Davido and Asake, and for a filmmaking style that combines emotional storytelling, observation of everyday life and cinematic imagery.He began experimenting with filmmaking using an iPhone. As his work developed, Dulsé became particularly interested in human emotion and in finding visual beauty in ordinary people, places and situations. This approach became a recurring element of his work, alongside more stylized forms of cinematic world-building. His films frequently move between intimate, observational moments and heightened visual environments, with music and contemporary African culture serving as recurring influences. His filmography includes Rema's "Calm Down," Wizkid featuring Tems' "Essence," Kizz Daniel's "Odo," Pheelz's "Finesse," Mavin's "Overdose," Oxlade's "Ku Lo Sa,"Burna Boy's "Common Person," Patoranking's "Abule" and Bayanni's "Ta Ta Ta." Across his wider body of work, his music videos have accumulated more than 3 billion views. Dulsé has worked with African artists including Wizkid, Burna Boy, Davido, Rema, Asake, Tiwa Savage, Patoranking, Kizz Daniel, Fireboy DML, Adekunle Gold, Omah Lay, Ayra Starr, Victony, Teni, Seyi Vibez and Fally Ipupa. His international collaborations include Future, Skepta and Jason Derulo. His work has received recognition at African and international music awards. He is an NAACP Image Awards winner and a Soul Train Music Awards nominee, and has won The Headies Best Music Video category twice for Davido's "1 Milli" and Rema's "Calm Down." His work has also received nominations and recognition from AFRIMMA and the Soundcity MVP Awards Festival. In addition to music videos, Dulsé has directed commercial projects for brands including Pepsi, Sprite, DStv, betPawa, Munch It and Havana Club.He is a co-founder of Priorgold Pictures, through which he works across music videos, advertising and narrative filmmaking.Across these formats, his work is characterized by an emphasis on emotion, human connection and the visual details of everyday life. He has described ordinary environments and situations as an important source of inspiration, using them alongside more constructed cinematic imagery to explore contemporary African life and culture.

== Early life ==
Aremu Olaiwola Qudus was born on 13 November 1993, in Lagos State, Nigeria. Hails from Kwara State being born into a polygamous family. He choose to pursue a formal education in Creative Arts at Yaba College of Technology in Lagos.

== Career ==
Dulsé’s music video work has accumulated more than 3 billion views across his wider body of work. He directed the music video for Rema’s “Calm Down,” which has received more than 700 million views on YouTube. The video became the most-viewed Nigerian music video on YouTube and has been ranked as the second most-viewed African music video on the platform. Dulsé also directed the music video for Wizkid’s “Essence,” featuring Tems, which has received more than 261 million views on YouTube. The video received international recognition, including a Video of the Year nomination at the 2021 Soul Train Music Awards. “Essence” also won Outstanding Music Video at the NAACP Image Awards. His international work has included collaborations with American rapper Future, British rapper Skepta, and American singer Jason Derulo. His collaboration with Future marked a significant expansion of his work with international artists. Dulsé has received several awards and nominations for his music video work. He is a two-time winner of The Headies Award for Best Music Video, winning for Davido’s “1 Milli” and Rema’s “Calm Down” His work has also received recognition from the NAACP Image Awards and Soul Train Music Awards.In addition to music videos, Dulsé has directed commercial projects for brands including Pepsi, Sprite, DStv, betPawa, Munch It and Havana Club.

== Videography ==
Title	Year	Artist(s)	Ref(s)
"Isabella"	2017	T-Classic	
"Pareke"	2018	Teni	
"Aiye"	2018	Barry Jhay	
"Rambo"	2018	Dr Dolor feat. Teni	
"Case"	2018	Teni	
"Sensima"	2018	Skiibii feat. Rekaado Banks	
"Mo lowo"	2018	L.A.X	
"Necessary"	2018	DRB lasgidi feat. Odunsi	
"I Can't Kill Myself"	2019	Timaya	
"Your Love"	2019	Boj feat. Tiwa Savage	
"Jealous"	2019	Fireboy DML	
"Monalisa Remix"	2019	Lyta feat. Davido	
"Eh Oh Ah"	2019	SDK jay breeze	
"Monalisa"	2019	Lyta	
"Nobody fine pass you"	2019	T Classic	
"Jogor"	2019	Zlatan	
"Big Engine"	2019	Skiibii	
"Promise"	2019	Adekunle Gold feat. Simi	
"Wonderful"	2020	Burna Boy	
"Park Well"	2020	Tiwa Savage feat. Davido	
"Suzannah"	2020	Sauti Sol	
"Know You"	2020	Ladipoe feat. Simi	
"1 Milli"	2020	Davido	
"Abule"	2020	Patoranking	
"Pim Pim"	2020	Dice Ailes	
"Friday Feeling"	2020	Fireboy DML	
"As E Dey Go"	2020	Naira Marley	
"Insecure"	2020	Sauti Sol	
"Ase Se"	2020	Barry Jhay	
"Ojah"	2020	C Natty	
"Onyeka"	2021	Burna Boy	
"Essence"	2021	Wizkid feat. Tems	
"Rollin"	2021	Mist feat. Burna Boy	
"One Shirt"	2021	Ruger feat. D'Prince, Rema	
"Love Dont Cost"	2021	Magixx	
"Ozumba Mbadiwe"	2021	Reekado Banks	
"Running"	2021	Ladipoe feat. Fireboy DML	
"Move"	2021	Bad Boy Timz	
"Bounce"	2021	Rema	
"Balon D'OR"	2021	Burna Boy feat. Wizkid	
"Beggie Beggie"	2022	Ayra Starr feat. Ckay	
"Calm Down"	2022	Rema	
"Second Sermon"	2022	Blacksheriff feat. Burna Boy	
"Mercy"	2022	Adekunle Gold	
"Finesse"	2022	Pheelz feat. BNXN	
"Overloading (Overdose)"	2022	Mavin All Star	
"Woman"	2022	Omah Lay	
"Bounce"	2022	BNXN feat. Wande Coal	
"Somebody"	2022	Diamond Platnumz	
"Melody"	2022	Diamond Platnumz feat. Jaywillz	
"Ku Lo Sa"	2022	Oxlade	
"Roll On Me"	2022	Evrywhr feat. Patoranking	
"Cough(Odo)"	2022	Kizz Daniel	
"Common Person"	2022	Burna Boy	
"Holiday"	2023	Rema	
"Money & Love"	2023	Wizkid	
"Party No Day Stop"	2023	Adekunle Gold feat. Zinoleesky	
"Blessings"	2023	DJ Tunez feat. Wizkid, Gamba & Wande Coal	
"Tatata Remix"	2023	Bayanni feat. Jason Derulo	
"Ogaranya"	2023	Adekunle Gold	
"Yo Fam"	2023	Sarz feat. Crayon & Skrillex	
"Ebelebe"	2023	Wande Coal feat. Wizkid	
"CBN"	2023	Skiibii feat. Seyi Vibez, Reekado Banks, Teni, Mayorkun	
"Babylon"	2023	Victony feat. Patoranking	
"Ngozi"	2023	Crayon feat. Ayra Starr	
"IDG"	2023	Wizkid feat. Zlatan Ibile	
"Diamonds"	2023	Wizkid	
"Fakosi"	2023	Reekado Banks feat. Seyi Vibez	
"Today"	2023	Seyi Vibez	
"Cana"	2023	Seyi Vibez	
2024	2023	"Benin Boys"	Rema feat. Shallipopi
2024	"Bundle By Bundle"	Burna Boy	
2026	"Oba"	Asake	

== Commercials ==
Year	Brand	Title
2020	DStv	Football Is Back
2020	DStv	Festive
2021	Kellogg's	World's Number One
2021	Havana Club	Skepta X Havana Club 2.0
2021	Munch iT	Non Stop Munch
2024	Pepsi feat. Young John	Big Big Things Remix
2024	Sprite feat. Fireboy DML	My Story
2025	The King’s Trust International	Generation Potential
2026	Gtco (Gtbank) - Fashion is timeless	Fashion is timeless

== Awards and nominations ==
Year	Event	Prize	Recipient	Result	Ref(s)
2020	All Africa Music Awards	Video of the year	"Burna Boy (Wonderful)" ^{[A]}	Nominated	
2020	All Africa Music Awards	Video of the year	"Sauti Sol (Suzanna)" ^{[A]}	Nominated	
2020	The Headies 2020	Best Music Video	"Davido (1 Milli)" ^{[A]}	Won	
2021	All Africa Music Awards	Best African Video	"Patoranking (Abule)" ^{[A]}	Nominated	
2021	Afrimma	Video of the year	"Wizkid feat. Tems (Essence)" ^{[A]}	Nominated	
2021	Afrimma	Video of the year	"Rema (Bounce)" ^{[A]}	Nominated	
2021	Soul Train Music Awards	Video of The Year	"Wizkid feat. Tems (Essence)" ^{[A]}	Nominated	
2021	African Entertainment Awards USA	Best Music Video	"Wizkid feat. Tems (Essence)" ^{[A]}	Won	
2022	The Headies 2022	Video of the year	"Ladipoe feat. Simi (Running)" ^{[A]}	Nominated	
2022	NAACP Image Awards	Outstanding Music Video/Visual Album	"Wizkid feat. Tems (Essence)" ^{[A]}	Won	
2023	Soundcity MVP Awards Festival	Video Of The Year	"Rema (Calm Down)" ^{[A]}	Nominated	
2023	16th Headies Awards	Best Music Video	"Rema (Calm Down)" ^{[A]}	Won	
2026	The Headies	Best Music Video	"Burna Boy (Bundle by Bundle )" ^{[A]}	Nominated	
