= TG Omori =

Nigerian cinematographer (born 1995)

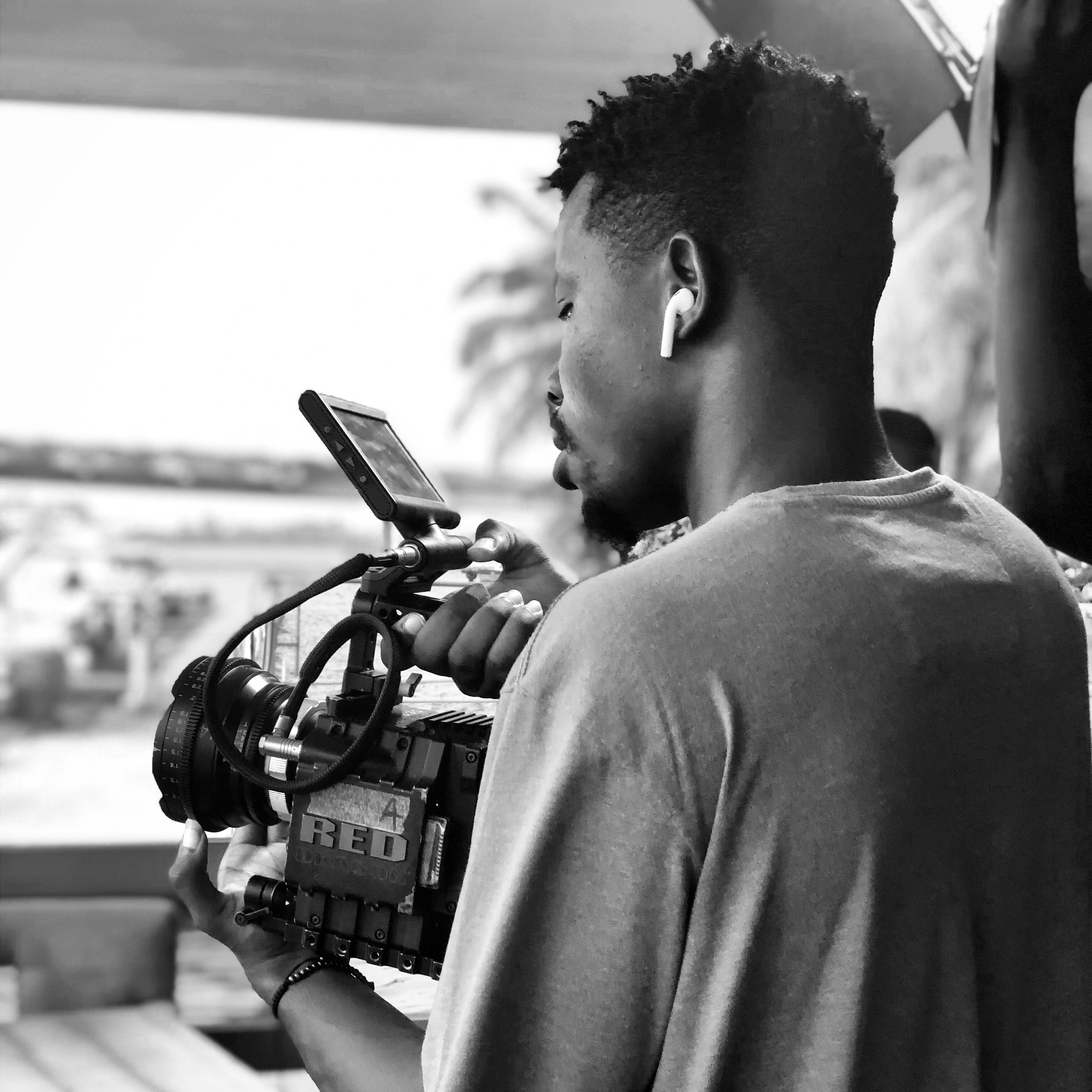
- Born: ThankGod Omori Jesam; 8 June 1995 (age 31); Cross River, Nigeria
- Other name: Boy Director
- Occupations: filmmaker, music video director, cinematographer, fashion stylist, designer
- Years active: 2016-present
- Website: tgomori.com

ThankGod Omori Jesam (born 8 June 1995) known professionally as TG Omori or Boy Director, is a Nigerian music video director and cinematographer.

== Early life ==
ThankGod Omori Jesam Obono Ubi hails from Cross-River State in Nigeria. Omori grew up in Agungi, Lagos State, Nigeria. He started directing at 15 years old while overseeing stage plays in his school and church. Omori started making videos at the age 16, but took it up professionally at 20 after graduating from PEFTI Film Institute.

== Career ==
The music video director has been in the industry since 2016. He has directed music videos for recording artists across various genres of new generation, including Davido, Olamide, Wizkid, Burna Boy, Tekno, Kizz Daniel, Fireboy DML, Falz, Timaya, Naira Marley, Asake and many others.

In 2019, TG Omori was responsible for approximately half of the videos on the summer 2019 charts Count down on MTV, Soundcity, and Trace. He directed videos for numerous musicians, including a controversial song by Naira Marley "Am I a Yahoo boy", "Totori" by Olamide & Wizkid, and "Soapy" by Naira Marley which won viewers Choice at the 2020 Soundcity MVP Awards Festival. In 2019, he won video director of the year at City People Entertainment Awards and directed two videos in top 10 most viewed Nigerian music videos of 2019.

A video for the North African remix featuring ElGrande Toto was released on 4 November 2021. It was shot in Lagos and was directed by TG Omori. The video surpassed 34 million views after one month on YouTube. In 2022 he played a major cultural role in the rise of Afro beat sensation Asake overseeing his creative visual and brand direction. Omori lead the direction on all the visuals on Asake's debut, breakout album "Mr Money." During the same year he won the Soundcity MVP's for video of the year with the video for Fireboy DML ft Asake Bandana. In 2022 he won African Music Video of the Year at the Afrima Awards in Senegal for: kizz Daniel ft Tekno Buga. His string of successful videos created a demand for his services with there was a backlash on his pricing including a his demand to be paid royalties on videos. This led to a debate on Twitter in 2023 about the possibility of directors getting royalties for their services off YouTube videos. TG Omori is commonly considered to be a leader in a newer generation of creatives across Africa due to his personality and "star power" redefining what the influence should be for directors. In August 2024, his health crisis went public after a failed kidney transplant. In February 2025 he made a comeback video project with the artist Seyi Vibez for his song "Shaolin" which had over 8 million views indicating massive reach. This project brought a lot of positive attention throughout Africa for Omori.

== Fashion ==
TG Omori has appeared also as a fashion model and has featured on the runway of the prominent Heineken Lagos fashion week.

== Videography ==
Year	Artiste	Song title
2018	Ycee	My Side
2019	Olamide, Wizkid & I.D Cabasa	Totori
2019	Naira Marley	Soapy
2019	Teni	Billionaire
2019	Timaya	Stoopid
2019	Wizkid & Blaq Jersey	Blow
2019	Naira Marley	Am I a Yahoo Boy,
2019	Fireboy DML & D smoke	King
2019	Falz	Girls
2019	Fireboy	Vibration
2019	Fireboy	What if I say
2019	Olamide	Pawon
2019	Tekno	Skeletun
2019	Tekno	Suru
2019	Tekno (feat. Zlatan Ibile)	Agege
2019	Blaqbonez	Shut Up
2019	Victor AD	Kpokpo Didi
2019	D'banj	Shy
2020	Burna Boy	Odogwu
2020	Oxlade	Away
2020	DJ Neptune, Joeboy & Mr Eazi	Nobody
2020	Joeboy	Call
2020	Vector (feat. Davido)	Comfort
	Carterson	Yur Luv
2021	CKay (feat. ElGrande Toto)	Love Nwantiti [North African remix]
2021	Portable (feat. Olamide)	Zazoo Zehh
2021	Phyno	Onyeuwa
2021	Kcee	Cultural Vibes
2021	Timaya (feat. BNXN)	Cold Outside
2021	Cheque	Call Me Baby
2021	Blaqbonez (feat. Joeboy)	Fendi
2021	Zlatan (feat. BNXN)	Alubarika
2022	Reekado Banks (feat. Fireboy DML)	Ozumba Mbadiwe
2022	Mayorkun (feat. Victony)	Holy Father
2022	Asake	Sungba
2022	Asake	Organise
2022	Skales	Nobody to Somebody
2022	Rema	Are you there
2022	Fireboy (feat. Asake)	Bandana
2022	Asake	Terminator

== Awards and nominations ==
Year	Event	Prize	Recipient	Result	Ref
2019	City People Entertainment Awards	Best Music Video Director of the Year	Himself	Won	
2020	AFRIMMA	Best Music Video Director of the Year	Himself	Won	
2021	The Headies	Best Music Video	Himself for "Billionaire" (Teni)	Nominated	
2022	The Headies	Best music video Director of the year	Himself for "Champion" (Fireboy DML)	Won	
2023	The Future Awards Africa	Prize for Film	Himself	Nominated	
2023	The Headies	Best Music Video	Himself for "Peace Be Unto You (PBUY)" (Asake)	Nominated	
2023	The Headies	Best Music Video	Himself for "Bandana" (Asake & Fireboy DML)	Nominated	

== See also ==
- List of Nigerian cinematographers
