= Telz (producer) =

Nigerian record producer (born 1996)

- Born: Alli Odunayo; 23 December 1996 (age 29); Lagos, Nigeria
- Origin: Ondo State, Nigeria
- Genres: Pop, Afropop
- Occupation: Record producer
- Instruments: Flute; piano; drums; synthesizer
- Years active: 2018–present

Alli Odunayo (born 23 December 1996), professionally known as Telz, is a Nigerian record producer and songwriter known for primarily producing Burna Boy's Grammy award winning album Twice As Tall and Patoranking's 2020 commercially acclaimed hit song "Abule".

He is notable with the mainstream sound marks Funkula, which is well known in the Nigerian mainstream music scene.

== Early life and career ==
He hails from Ondo State, Nigeria. A graduate of Babcock University with a degree. He began his recording career in 2011 with a few singles that he released in 2014 and 2015.

In 2020, Burna Boy's Twice As Tall album had Telz as the principal producer, with P Diddy serving as executive producer. The album also featured Timbaland's creations which later won the 63rd Annual Grammy Awards for Best Global Music Album category.

== Production discography ==
Artiste	Title	Reference
Burna Boy	"Wonderful"	
Burna Boy feat. Naughty By Nature	"Naughty By Nature"	
Patoranking	"Abule"	
Burna Boy	"Wetin Dey Sup"	
Burna Boy	"Onyeka"	
Burna Boy feat. Stormzy	"Real Life"	
Patoranking feat. Flavour	"Mon Bebe"	
Laycon	"Bam Bam"	
Patoranking	"Do Me"	
Laycon feat. Joeboy	"Kele"	
D.O feat. Olamide	"Wetin You Smoke"	
Burna Boy	"Common Person"	
Burna Boy featuring J Hus	"Cloak & Dagger"	
Burna Boy feat. Khalid	"Wild Dreams"	
Fireboy DML	"Ashawo"	
Wurld	"Sad Tonight"	
Mayorkun	"Freedom"	
Blaqbonez	"4 Door Jeep"	
Spacely	"Paradise"	
Ninety	"Somebody"	
Omawumi	"Mr Whiny"	
Laime	"Higher Vibrations"	
Zarion Uti	"War"	
Remy Baggins & Ejoya feat. PsychoYP & Mojo	"Gboju"	
Laime feat. Lojay	"Funk Flex"	
Kobi Jonz	"Dada"	

== Awards and nominations ==
Year	Event	Prize	Recipient	Result	Ref
2020	Maya Awards (Africa)	Best Producer Of the year	Himself	Won	
2021	63rd Annual Grammy Awards	Twice As Tall for Best Global Music Album	certificate	Won	
2021	The Beatz Awards	Producer of the Year	Himself (“Abule”)	Nominated	
2021	The Beatz Awards	Afro Highlife Producer of the Year	Himself	Nominated	
2021	The Beatz Awards	Afro Dancehall Producer of the Year	Himself	Won	
