= Fireboy DML =

Nigerian singer (born 1996)

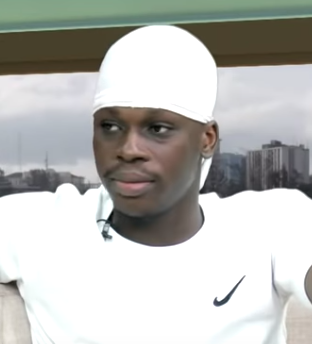
- Fireboy DML in 2019

Background information
- Born: Adedamola Oyinlola Adefolahan; 5 February 1996 (age 30); Abeokuta, Ogun State, Nigeria
- Education: Obafemi Awolowo University
- Genres: Afrobeats; R&B; Afropop
- Occupations: Singer; songwriter
- Years active: 2014–present
- Labels: YBNL; Empire
- Website: fireboydml.com

Adedamola Oyinlola Adefolahan (born 5 February 1996), known professionally as Fireboy DML, is a Nigerian singer and songwriter. In 2018, he signed a record deal with YBNL Nation, a record label founded by rapper Olamide. His debut studio album, Laughter, Tears and Goosebumps, was released in 2019. He won Listener's Choice and was nominated for Song of the Year for "Jealous" at the 2020 Soundcity MVP Awards Festival. His third studio album, Playboy, entered the Billboard 200 at number 123. His latest album, Adedamola, was released in 2024.

== Early life and education ==
Fireboy DML was born on 5 February 1996 and raised in Abeokuta, Ogun state, and was a member of his church choir. He developed an interest in music while studying at Obafemi Awolowo University, where he graduated with a bachelor's degree in English. He moved to Lagos to pursue music as a full-time career.

== Music career ==
=== 2018–2020: LTG and Apollo ===
His breakthrough single "Jealous" first appeared on YBNL Nation's collaborative album, YBNL Mafia Family (2018), before being re-released on 25 March 2019. The song is composed of guitar riffs, traditional drums and percussion; it combines African harmonies with elements of country and soul music. "Jealous" was produced by Cracker Mallo. The visuals for "Jealous" were directed by Director K.

In June 2019, Fireboy DML released the ballad single "What If I Say". It was produced by Pheelz, who incorporated a mix of percussion, ambient synth harmonies, and a drum riff into the production and plugged by Olaitan. The visuals for "What If I Say" was directed by TG Omori. On 1 August 2019, Fireboy DML released another single titled "King." The accompanying music video was directed by TG Omori; it contains images of Fireboy and his love interest in a rose petal embellished Rolls-Royce, and images of him singing at a fashion show where models walk on a runway.

Fireboy released his debut studio album, Laughter, Tears and Goosebumps, on 29 November 2019. It was initially scheduled for release on 25 November. The album's music is a brand of R&B that combines love and social issues with empirical songwriting. LTG comprises 13 tracks and doesn't feature any guest artist; it amassed over 6 million streams on Spotify three days after its release. It received generally positive reviews from music critics, but was criticized for being labeled an "Afro-Life" record instead of an R&B album. LTG was supported by the previously released singles "Jealous", "What If I Say", and "King". The single "Vibration" was a fan favourite.

On 17 August 2020, Fireboy unveiled the tracklist to his sophomore studio album, Apollo. Ivie Ani of Pitchfork gave the album an 8.3 rating out of 10, calling it "the peak of his vision so far, a melodious, detailed, and effortless album of feel-good pop and R&B". NotJustOk wrote: "At the base of his writing is a deep-seated knack for introspection, the desire to be himself and a whole others like himself, spinning personal and borrowed accounts of existential crisis, ambition, love, lust and depression."

In 2021, Fireboy released the single "Peru," which Music in Africa wrote "affirms [his] Afrobeats intelligence." He was featured on Ladipoe's hit "Running" and WSTRN's single "Be My Guest", and Cheque's single "History". He made a musical appearance on The Tonight Show Starring Jimmy Fallon, performing a medley of his songs "Vibration" from Tears, Laughter and Goosebumps, and "Champion" from Apollo.

On 24 December 2021, he released a remix version of "Peru" with Ed Sheeran, which debuted at number 53 on the United States' Billboard Hot 100 chart and peaked at number 2 on the United Kingdom's Official Singles Chart in 2022. It became certified platinum by the Recording Industry Association of America (RIAA).

=== 2022–present: Collaborations, Playboy and Adedamola ===
On 3 March 2022, Fireboy was featured on the Sickick remix to Madonna's 1998 single "Frozen". The official music video was filmed on the same day. On 6 July 2022, Fireboy announced via his official Twitter account that his third studio album entitled Playboy would be out by 5 August 2022.

In 2024, Fireboy was featured on the Justin Timberlake song "Liar", appearing on Timberlake's sixth studio album Everything I Thought It Was. He released his fourth studio album, Adedamola, on 29 August 2024. The album featured prominent Nigerian and international artists such as Lagbaja on "Back n Forth" and Jon Batiste on "Ready" and "Jon's Interlude".

== Artistry ==
Fireboy describes his sound as "Afro-Life" and said he writes songs to which the audiences can relate. Alphonse Pierre of Pitchfork characterized his sound as "slow-groove pop" and stated it "tells stories about love with the formulaic structure of a Hallmark Christmas romance".

He has cited Jon Bellion, Passenger, and Wande Coal as his key contemporary influences.

== In popular culture ==
In 2020, Fireboy DML gained media coverage in Nigeria when his hit single "Champion" was used by FC Bayern Munich for their UEFA Super Cup celebrations. His song "Scatter" from his debut album Laughter, Tears and Goosebumps was included in the FIFA 21 game soundtrack. In November 2022, his song, "Coming Back For You," was included on the Black Panther: Wakanda Forever soundtrack.

Fireboy DML received a plaque for having sold out Royal Albert Hall in 2025.

== Discography ==
Studio albums

- Laughter, Tears and Goosebumps (2019)
- Apollo (2020)
- Playboy (2022)
- Adedamola (2024)

== Awards and nominations ==
Year	Award ceremony	Prize	Recipient	Result	Ref
2019	The Headies	Next Rated	Himself	Nominated	
2019	The Headies	Viewer's Choice	Himself	Nominated	
2019	The Headies	Song of the Year	"Jealous"	Nominated	
2019	City People Music Awards	Most Promising Act of the Year	Himself	Won	
2019	City People Music Awards	Best New Act of the Year	Himself	Nominated	
2019	City People Music Awards	Revelation of the Year	Himself	Nominated	
2020	Soundcity MVP Awards Festival	Song of the Year	"Jealous"	Nominated	
2020	Soundcity MVP Awards Festival	Listeners' Choice	Fireboy DML for "Jealous"	Won	
2020	Soundcity MVP Awards Festival	Best New MVP	Himself	Nominated	
2020	Mobo Award	Best African Act	Himself	Won	
2020	The Headies	Album of the Year	Apollo	Won	
2020	The Headies	Best Pop Album	Apollo	Won	
2020	The Headies	Best R&B Album	"Tears, Laughter and Goosebumps"	Won	
2020	The Headies	Best R&B Single	"Tattoo"	Won	
2020	The Headies	Headies Revelation	Fireboy DML	Won	
2021	African Entertainment Awards USA	Song of the Year	"Peru"	Nominated	
2021	All Africa Music Awards	African Fan's Favourite	Himself	Won	
2021	NAACP Image Awards	Outstanding International Song	"Peru"	Nominated	
2021	The Future Awards Africa	Prize for Music (Endowed by Infinix)	Himself	Nominated	
2022	The Headies	Best Songwriter of the Year	"Peru"	Nominated	
2022	The Headies	Best Afrobeat Single (Nigeria)	"Peru"	Won	
2022	The Headies	Song of the Year	"Peru"	Nominated	
2022	The Headies	Viewer's Choice	Himself for "Peru"	Nominated	
2022	Mobo Award	Best African Act	Himself	Nominated	
2022	BET Awards	Best International Act	Himself	Nominated	
