= Lagos Creative Industry Fair =

Annual creative fair in Lagos, Nigeria

- Status: Active
- Venue: Freedom Park, Broad Street, Lagos Island
- Locations: Lagos, Lagos State, Nigeria
- Country: Nigeria
- Inaugurated: 2015
- Organizer: Lagos Chamber of Commerce and Industry (LCCI)
- Website: http://lagoschamber.com/lagos-international-trade-fair/

The Lagos Creative Industry Fair is a section of the renowned Lagos International Trade Fair programming and is meant to widen the scope of the general trade fair to include other sectors that are usually left out, especially the creative industry.

The Creative Fair was organized with the aim of bringing together the business community and the entertainment community. The event features activities such as a Creative industry roundtable - An all-encompassing forum on the current trend and the future of the Creative industry featuring presentations, conversations and discussions and showcases by/between/among/ leaders of the various sub-sectors in the creative industry – music, movie, comedy, theatre, fashion, media, show business and others, especially the interconnectedness and interdependence among the various sub-sectors.
