= Lagos International Trade Fair =

Trade fair in Lagos, Nigeria

- LITF
- Interactive map of Lagos International Trade Fair
- Address: Tafawa Balewa Square, Onikan, Lagos Island
- Location: Lagos, Lagos State, Nigeria
- Coordinates: 6°27′49″N 3°14′49″E
- Operator: Lagos Chamber of Commerce and Industry (LCCI)
- Type: International Trade Fair
- Surface: 350 hectare

Construction
- Built: 1974-1977
- Opened: 1977
- Architects: Zoran Bojović, with Predrag Ðaković, Milorad Cvijić & Ljiljana Bojović
- Builder: Energoprojekt holding

Website
- lagosinternationaltradefair.com.ng

The Lagos International Trade Fair (LITF) is the largest international exhibition in West Africa. The Trade Fair is the premier International Trade Fair in Nigeria with a 10-day event usually starting on the first Friday of November, annually.

== History ==
The first Lagos international trade fair was held in 1977 shortly after Eko Hotels and Suites was completed.

It is staged every year and organized by the Trade Promotions Board and the oldest chamber of commerce in Nigeria: the Lagos Chamber of Commerce and Industry (LCCI). It is reputed to be the largest business market in the ecowas sub-region as it attracts investors from other parts of the world. It is a 10-day annual fair which begins in the first Friday of November.

The fair is one of the major attractions of Lagos' commercial yearly activities. Since its inception, it has grown to become the largest trade show in subsaharan Africa and has attracted both national and international entrepreneurs from over 1600 companies all over the world The Trade Fairs spans approximately 40,000 m^{2} (48,000 yd^{2}) of exhibited space. The Fair which is staged with the support and co-operation of the Federal and the State Governments covers all aspects of business and economic activities in Nigeria. It offers a unique exposition for manufacturers, suppliers, buyers and users of a wide range of goods and services as well as opportunities for investment and trade promotions. It was initially staged at the Lagos Trade Fair Complex at Badagry Expressway, Ojo before relocating to Tafawa Balewa Square. The Lagos International trade fair complex is a hexagonal shaped exhibition hall covered with space roof elements and shading panels, which formed a new trend in architectural innovation of its time over the years. Organizations partnered with the fair include the National directorate of employment, Nigerian business organisations, foreign organisations and governments, ECOWAS member states, diplomatic missions and trade representatives, federal and state government-owned companies, agencies, parastatals, research and educational institutions Nigerian celebrities are appointed as goodwill Ambassadors as part of measures to spice up the programme and Companies are allowed to make use of side attractions to source for patronage.

== Subsections Of The Fair ==
In September 2015, the Chairman, Trade Promotion Board of the LCCI, Dr. Olawale Cole, announced that the Trade Fair will be holding simultaneously in 3 different locations. He further revealed that the events will be the general trade fair which will hold at the Tafawa Balewa Square; the Lagos Creative Industry Fair which will hold at Freedom Park; and the Business to Business Exhibition which will hold at Muson Centre.

=== Lagos Creative Industry Fair ===
Eko Akete is a ten-day cultural manifestation during which hundreds of performers animate Freedom Park, Lagos with artistic and intellectual offerings. Both indigenous and international acts perform in what is said to be the biggest cultural fair in West Africa.

According to the Creative Industry Principal Partner, Jahman Anikulapo, "Lagos Creative Festival 'EKO AKETE' organised by the Lagos Chamber of Commerce and Industry in conjunction with CORA and Freedom Park will be used to showcase the creative industry and explore the linkage between the creative industry and the formal businesses."

In 2015, the Lagos Chamber of Commerce & Industry presents the 2015 Lagos International Trade Fair, the premiere international trade fair in West Africa.

=== Business To Business Exhibition ===
The Business to Business Exhibition of the Lagos International Trade Fair holds at Muson Centre, and hosts multinational organizations and foreign investors; and serves as a platform for exhibitions, networking, Business-to-Business meetings, and an Investment Conference.
