= Skateboarding in Nigeria =

Skateboarding in the country of Nigeria

Skateboarding In Nigeria
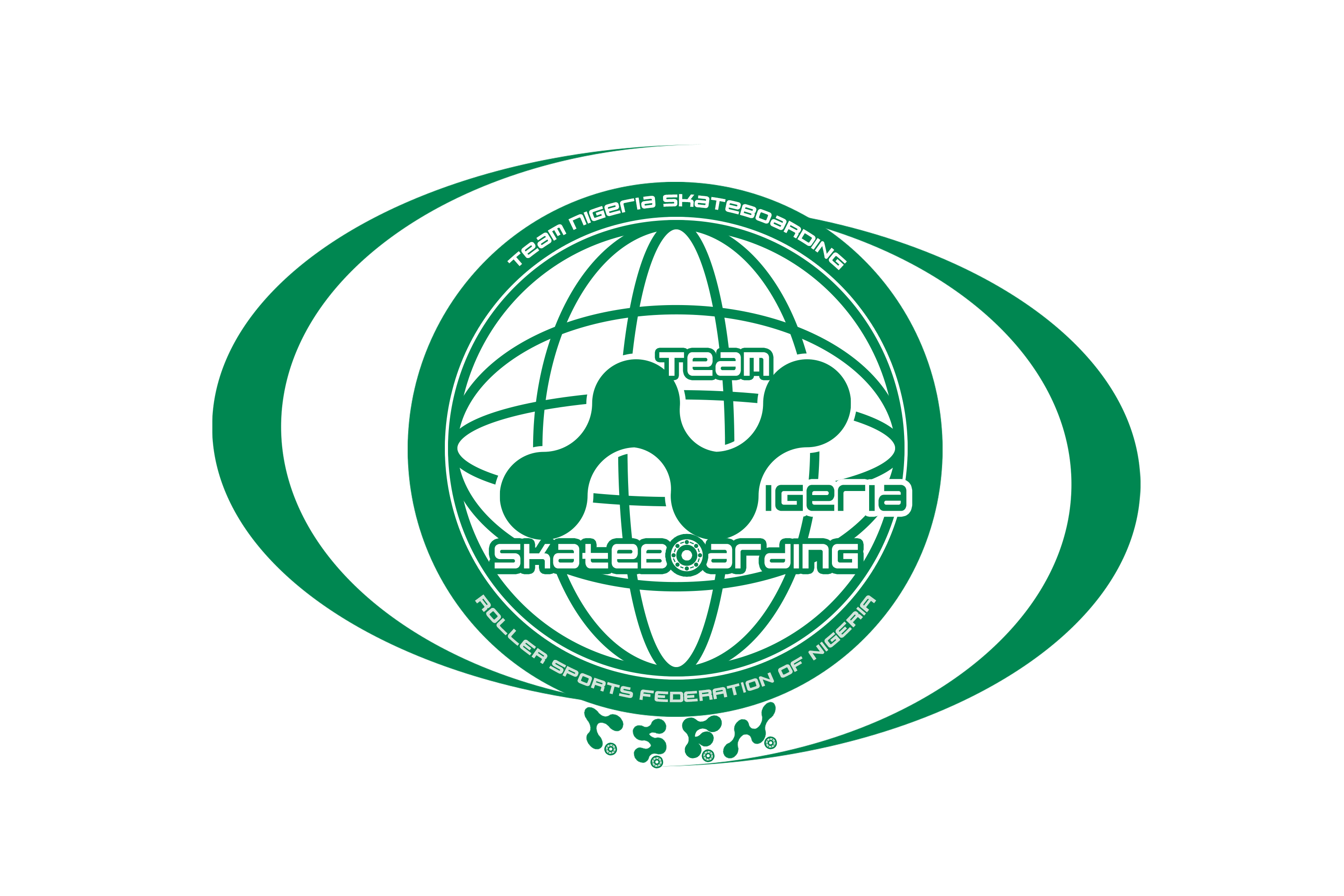
- Fahd Bello skateboarding in Lagos
- Governing body: Roller Sports Federation of Nigeria (RSFN)

Skateboarding in Nigeria started in the early 2010s as a very underground scene, of people skating at street spots in the areas surrounding National Stadium in the Surulere area of Lagos, as well as building of DIY ramps, rails, and other skate obstacles for social media posts.

Skateboarding in Nigeria has grown from a small underground scene to a rapidly growing sport in major Nigerian cities, particularly Lagos and Abuja. The Lagos skate scene has spawned new streetwear brands, the construction of Nigeria's first concrete skate park, and efforts for Nigeria to be represented in skateboarding at the LA28 Olympic Games, having already had Nigerian representation at 2026 World Skate Olympic qualifiers.

== Skate parks ==
In March 2024, Nigeria opened its first skatepark, the WAF Skatepark, located on the grounds of the historic Freedom Park on Lagos Island. Designed by architectural firm Studio Contra, it is the first ever concrete park built in Nigeria. (There is another prefab wood park in Lagos that is mainly used for BMX riding.) WAF Skatepark often hosts community events and local skateboard contests.

Go Skate NG is currently raising funds to build the country's second skatepark, this time in the nation's capital, Abuja.

== Competitions ==
The Roller Sports Federation of Nigeria (RSFN)'s Team Nigeria skateboarding has a team of Nigerian skaters vying for spots at the 2028 Los Angeles Olympics, which will be the third Olympic Games to feature skateboarding. With the help of a financial donation by SHAPE Skateboard Foundation (a US based 501c3 geared towards promoting skateboarding in Africa), RSFN became an official World Skate recognized federation.

In June 2026 Imoh Ekasi-Otu became the first Nigerian skateboarder to compete at World Skate Olympic Qualifiers, competing in men's street at the World Skate Rome. RSFN youth team member Joseph "Sky Walker" Omojuwa won first place at the inaugural Francophone Skate Union Skateboarding Championship held in Cotonou, Benin, in January 2026.

The current RSFN Team Nigeria Skateboarding roster consists of men's street members Imoh Ekasi-Otu, Henry Okwubausi, and Fahd Bello, and women's park member Samantha Scarlette (Ilechuku). On the youth team are Joseph "Sky Walker" Omojuwa and Ayo Aderibgbe.

== Female skateboarders in Nigeria ==
The Nigerian skate scene is inclusive of female skaters. The female skate scene has been spread through social media and inclusive community events at local spots like the National Stadium and WAF Park, hosted by collectives such as Blessing Ewona's Den City and Joanna "Yaya" Ogun of international organization GRLSWIRL.

== Nigerian skating brands ==
Due to the high cost of imports and exports, products from international skate brands are hard to source in Nigeria, leading to growth of Nigerian manufactured skate brands. WAFFLESNCREAM (commonly stylized as waf. or WAF) was founded by Jomi Marcus-Bello, Nifemi Marcus-Bello, and KC Obijiakwu, in 2008 in Leeds, UK. It relocated to Lagos in the 2010s, becoming Nigeria's first skateboard brand.

Nigerian designer and artist Olaolu Slawn, known for working with Virgil Abloh and other international brands, started out working for WAF. WAF provided the funding for the nation's only skatepark. In 2021, WAF released a skate video called Glory (2021), which introduced Henry Okwubuasi, the brand's first professional skater. WAF has since issued pro models to other Nigerian pro skaters such as Fahd Bello.

WAF has done significant collaborations with notable global brands such as Coca-Cola. In July 2026, WAF teamed up with Adidas for a sneaker collab with an ad campaign featuring Fahd Bello and local Lagos skater Joseph "Sky Walker" Omojuwa.

Smaller brands in the Nigerian skate scene include A Bear Company (founded by Henry Okwubuasi after leaving WAF) and PITH Africa.

American skateboard street wear brands Stussy & Off-White have done exclusive collaborations with Nigerian skate street wear brand Homecoming.

== Music ==
In November 2024, Spotify Africa launched the "Skate Noise Lagos" promotional campaign. The campaign featured Nigerian pro skateboarders Fahd Bello and Henry Okwubuasi skateboarding through the streets of Lagos while the song "Skating" by Nigerian music artist Asake (from his album Lungu Boy) plays in the background.
