= Olaolu Slawn =

Nigerian artist and designer

Slawn
- Born: Olaolu Akeredolu-Ale; October 24, 2000 (age 25); Nigeria
- Education: Middlesex University
- Children: 2

Olaolu Akeredolu-Ale (born 24 October 2000), better known as Slawn or Olaolu Slawn, is a Nigerian designer and artist. Most of his works include spray paint, large-scale pop art canvases, graffiti, caricatures and murals. In 2023, he became the youngest person to design the Britannia statuette for the annual BRIT awards.

== Life and career ==
In his late-teens, Slawn worked at Wafflesncream, Nigeria's first skate shop. He met his friends Leo and Onyedi at the shop, and the three would create artwork, skate together, and make films. Eventually, they created an apparel group named Motherlan. The brand would gain popularity in Nigeria and received recognition from Virgil Abloh.

In 2018, Slawn moved to London and enrolled at Middlesex University to study graphic design in 2019. During the beginning of the COVID-19 pandemic, he began to paint. Slawn would hand his artwork to people at parties and established a social media presence for his artwork.

He had his debut exhibition in September 2021 at Truman Brewery on Brick Lane. In an interview with The Face, he is quoted as saying, "I don't even know why people want this shit ... I wouldn't buy this shit. I just have no interest in my art. I make it so I can fuck about.”

In 2022, Skepta debuted his first painting on a collection for Sotheby's auction organized by Slawn for charity.

He was the statuette and set designer for the 2023 Brit Awards. On May 22, 2023, Slawn opened BeauBeau's Cafe, a family-run restaurant in East London that is named after his son. On 5 October 2023, on an interview with The Native, Slawn spoke on what Odumodu's mixtape Eziokwu meant to him, and how he channeled it, into the painting; when he was asked: He said “Eziokwu means hefty as far as I’m concerned. Undeniable, hefty, and very unapologetic. Those are the best three words I can use to describe it. It’s big energy.”

For his first major London exhibition, Slawn collaborated with gallerists Phoebe Saatchi and Arthur Yates to create I present to you, Slawn, at Saatchi Yates Gallery, Bury Street (Sept. 12–Oct. 20, 2024). The show’s centerpiece was a mural composed of 1,000 small canvases, each priced at £1,000. All of them sold out during the exhibition.

Late 2024, Slawn presented an art car with his work on it, a Lancia Delta Integrale. Because the Delta has won six World Rally Championship titles in the 1980-90s, with this project Slawn brought street art and rallysport together, as well as heritage and contemporary art.

== Art ==
Slawn is known for his provocative style which has become recognizable, becoming a moniker of his brand. His work takes references from other artists such as KAWS, Andy Warhol, and more, integrating graffiti to add a personal twist. His artwork has been labeled for its controversial similarities of depictions of African Americans after the abolishment of slavery. The characters throughout his work are typically dark-skinned with exaggerated big bright red lips, which were common stereotypical traits labeled upon African Americans during the Jim Crow Era.

Slawn uses these depictions and flips the narrative, emphasizing the expressive nature of the characters. Slawn instead embodies the cartoon aesthetic and display bold, colorful and playful, reclaiming said stereotypes to portray African Americans as dominant figures through art.
