= Lagos Chamber of Commerce and Industry =

Lagos Chamber of Commerce & Industry
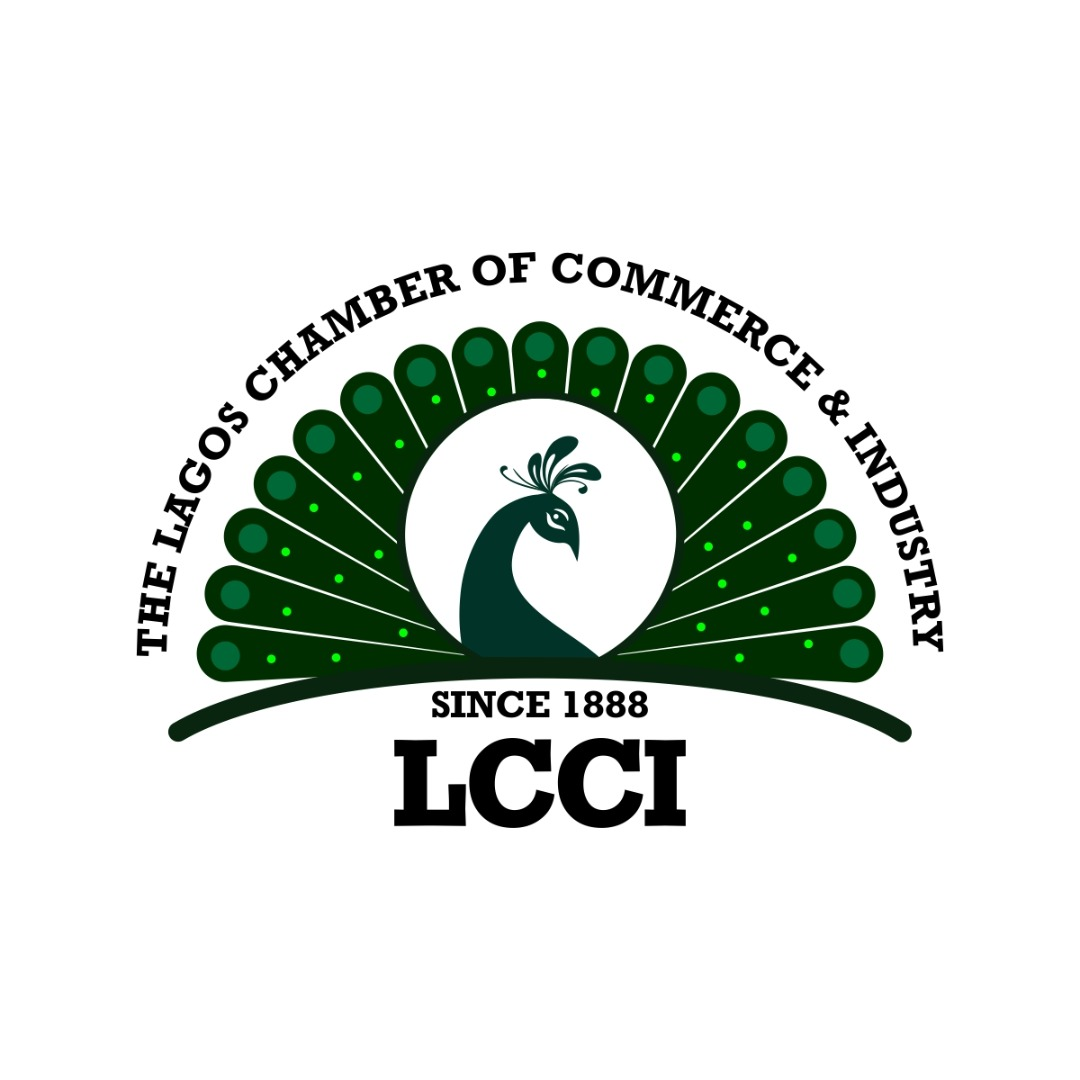
- Founded: 1888 (138 years ago)
- Purpose: Business advocacy & federation
- Location: Lagos, Nigeria
- Region served: Lagos metropolitan area
- Website: lagoschamber.com

The Lagos Chamber of Commerce & Industry is a non-profit organization that promotes the interests of the business community in Lagos, Nigeria. It provides a platform for businesses to express their opinions and concerns regarding legislative or other measures affecting trade, industry, commerce, and agriculture. The organization also represents the views of the Lagos business community on the economy as a whole. Its main goal is to support the growth and success of businesses in Lagos by advocating for their interests and providing resources and support. It boasts over 1,500 members with the current Director General being Chinyere Almona.

Founded on December 5, 1888, it was incorporated in 1950 as a non-profit making organization, Limited by Guarantee under the Companies Act of 1948. The Lagos Chamber of Commerce is the pioneer chamber of commerce in Nigeria.

Its prestigious Commerce House building which houses its offices is located in Victoria Island, where most Nigerian corporations have their national headquarters.

== Identity and Logo ==
In 2020, the Lagos Chamber of Commerce and Industry unveiled a refreshed visual identity to mark its 130th anniversary.The rebranding initiative aimed to modernize the Chamber's image while honoring its rich heritage. The new logo, designed by the Nigerian creative agency OneWildCard, draws inspiration from the previous logo with the peacock—a symbol of grace, pride, and resilience. This emblem reflects the Chamber's enduring commitment to fostering business growth and economic development in Nigeria.

The redesigned logo was officially introduced during a live event on December 3, 2020, signaling a new era for the organization. The updated identity has since been integrated across the Chamber's digital platforms and official communications, reinforcing its contemporary relevance and longstanding legacy.

== Chamber Awards ==
The Lagos Chamber of Commerce & Industry introduced the Chamber Awards in 2014 to recognize, promote and celebrate private and public institutions operating in Nigeria for best business practices, growth through innovations, business sustainability and positive impact on the people/Society.

The award recognized companies in the following industries - Banking, Insurance, Pension Management, E-Payment, Education, Telecoms, Professional Services, Healthcare, Oil & Gas, Manufacturing, Trade/Retail Trade, Building & Construction and SMEs.

For the 2015 Awards, Beat 99.9 FM on-air personality, Olisa Adibua and Rhythm 93.7 FM on-air personality & celebrity vlogger, Toke Makinwa were selected as the hosts of the 2015 Lagos Chambers of Commerce & Industry (LCCI) Awards.

== International Trade Fair ==
The Lagos Chamber of Commerce & Industry is well known for its annual Lagos International Trade Fair which was launched in 1977. It is said to be the largest trade fair in the West African sub-region and attracts investors from other parts of the world. The trade fair holds in Tafawa Balewa Square, Onikan, Lagos Island.

== Ambassadors ==
In October 2014, Lagos Chamber of Commerce unveiled 2face Idibia, Brymo, Vector and Kunle Afolayan as ambassadors. The entertainers were unveiled during an elaborate ceremony at the Commerce House, which is located on Idowu Taylor Street in Victoria Island, Lagos.
