= Freedom Park (Lagos) =

Public park in Lagos, Nigeria

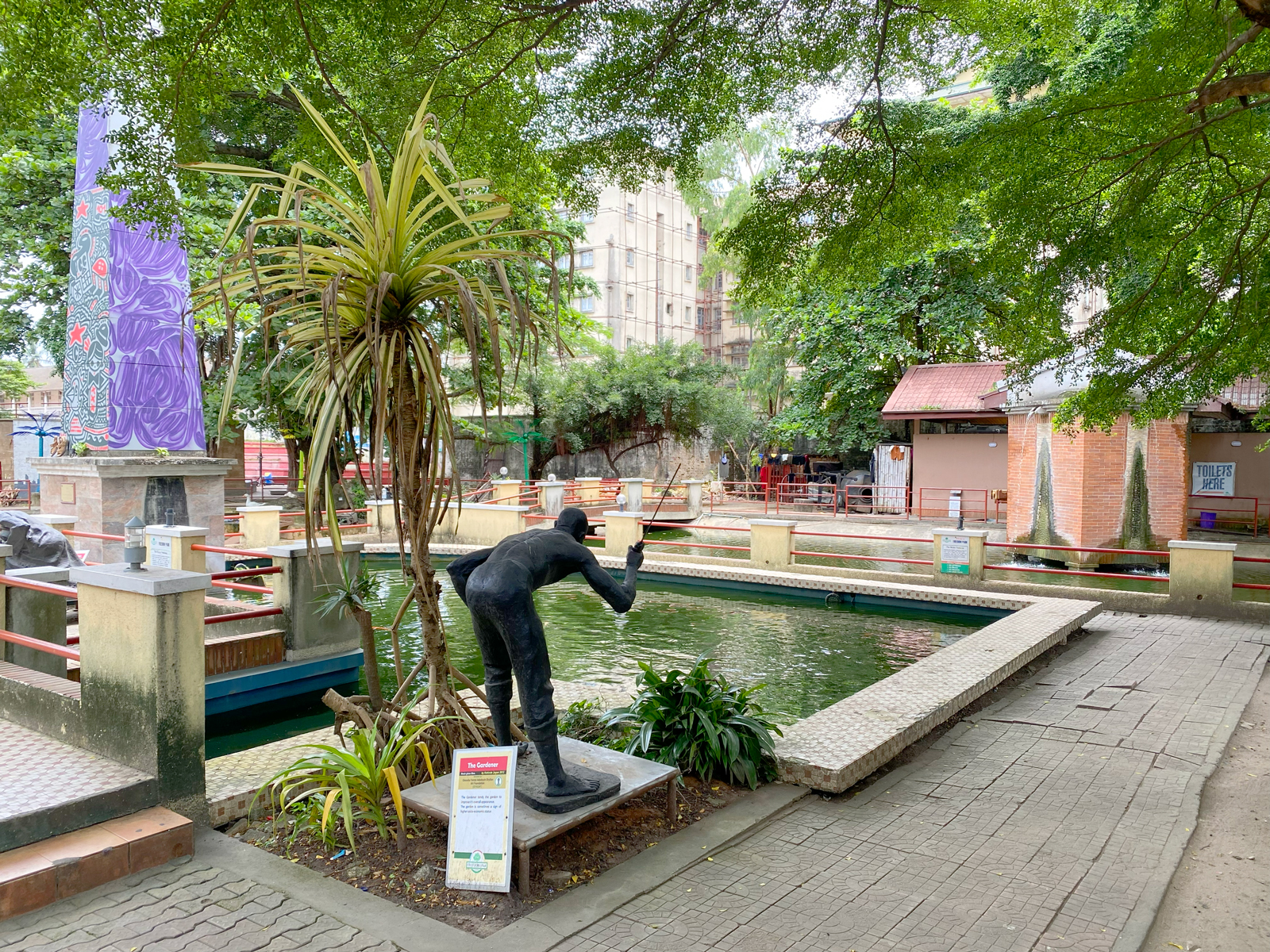
- Pond and statue in Freedom Park (2026)
- Interactive map of Freedom Park
- Type: Public park
- Location: Lagos Island
- Coordinates: 6.4489°N 3.3965°E
- Operator: Lagos State Parks and Gardens Agency
- Website: freedomparklagos.com

Freedom Park is a memorial and leisure park area in the middle of downtown Lagos in Lagos Island, Nigeria which was formerly Her Majesty's Broad Street Prison. It was designed by the architect Theo Lawson as a speculative project under the CIA-Lagos (formerly the Creative Intelligence Agency and now the Cultural Intellectual Association) in 1999.

The park was constructed to preserve the history and cultural heritage of Nigerians. Monuments in the park reveal the Lagos colonial heritage and history of Her Majesty's Broad Street prisons. It was built to commemorate the 50th anniversary independence celebration in October 2010. The park serves as a National Memorial, a Historical landmark, a Cultural site, Arts and Recreation centre.

The park, when it was a prison hosted some political activists who fought for Nigeria's independence.

The park, which is now a serene abode for individuals, visitors' collective contemplation and interaction is open to the public every day. Today, Freedom Park has become a venue for diverse social events and recreational entertainment.

In March of 2024, Nigeria's first skatepark, WAF. Skatepark, opened inside of Freedom Park.

== History ==
Broad Street Prison was established after Britain made Lagos a Colony in 1861 (see Lagos Treaty of Cession). The initial prison structure was built in 1882 with mud walls and grass thatch but did not last long because of sabotage from colonial government opponents. According to Theo Lawson, architect of Freedom Park, opponents of British colonialism in Lagos "kept throwing fire into it and setting it ablaze and so then in 1885 the colonial government imported bricks from England and rebuilt the prison". The colonial government's expense on the prison in 1882 (£16,000) revealed the government's priority on law and order versus other initiatives such as education which the government spent £700 on. The Colonial report for 1898 indicates that 676 males, 26 females, and 11 juveniles were imprisoned at Broad Street prison for the year.

Broad Street Prison was pulled down in 1979 and was reduced to a dumping ground until the 1990s when plans were drawn up to transform the site into a creative space.

== Notable prisoners at Broad Street Prison ==
- Herbert Macaulay
- Anthony Enahoro
- Obafemi Awolowo
- Michael Imoudu

== Gallery ==
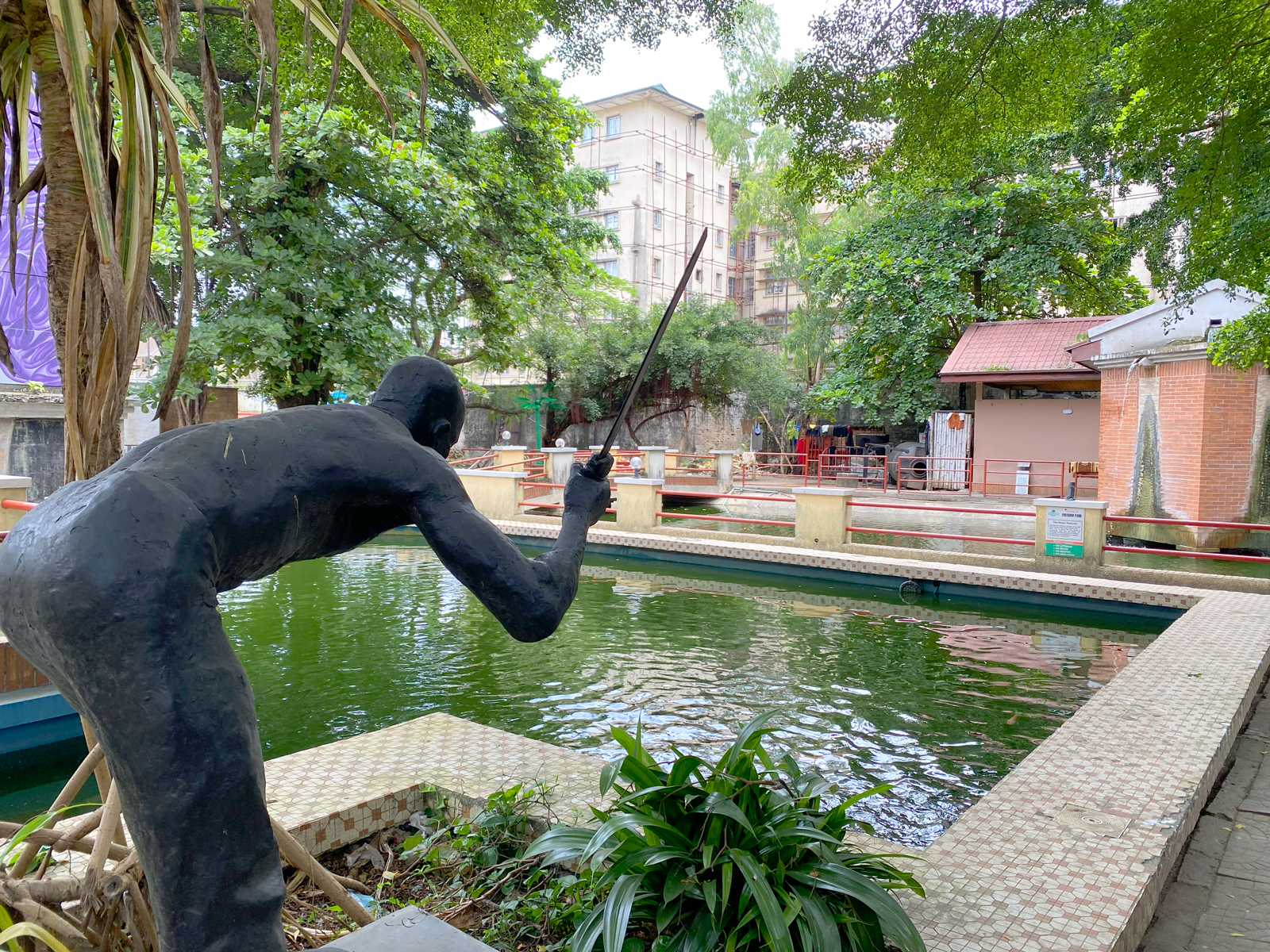
Pond with statue

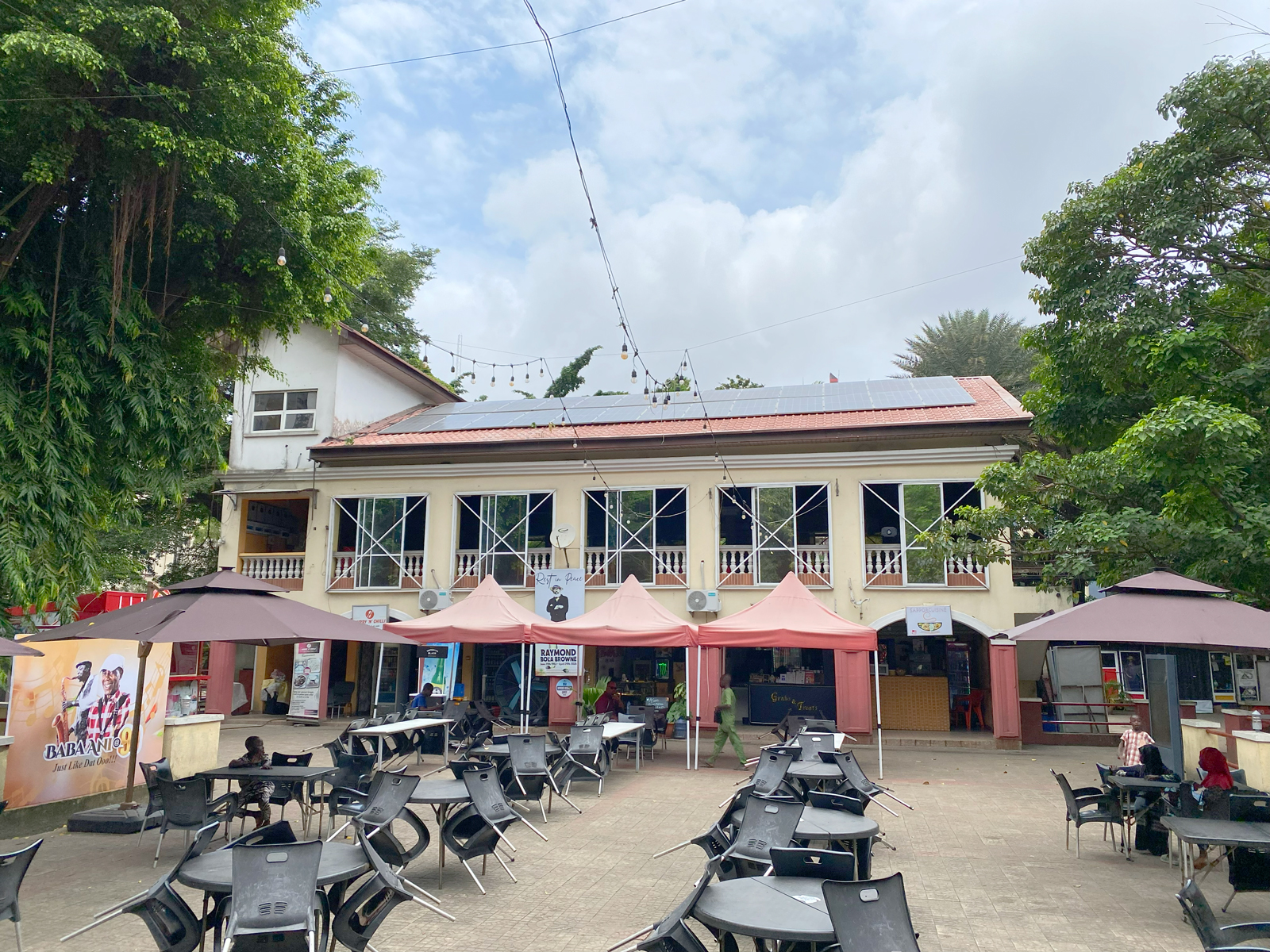
Cafe at music stage

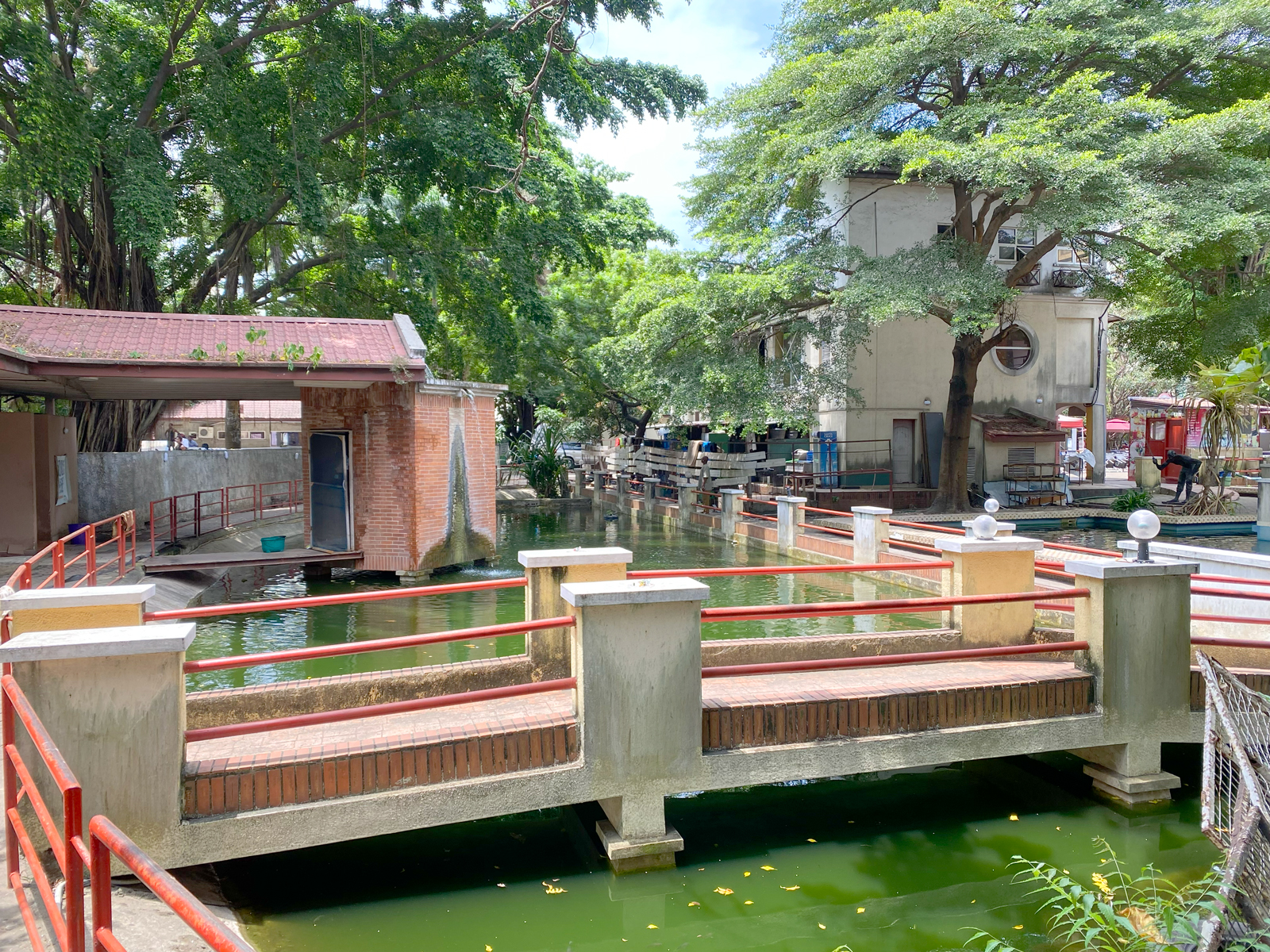
Pond with bridge

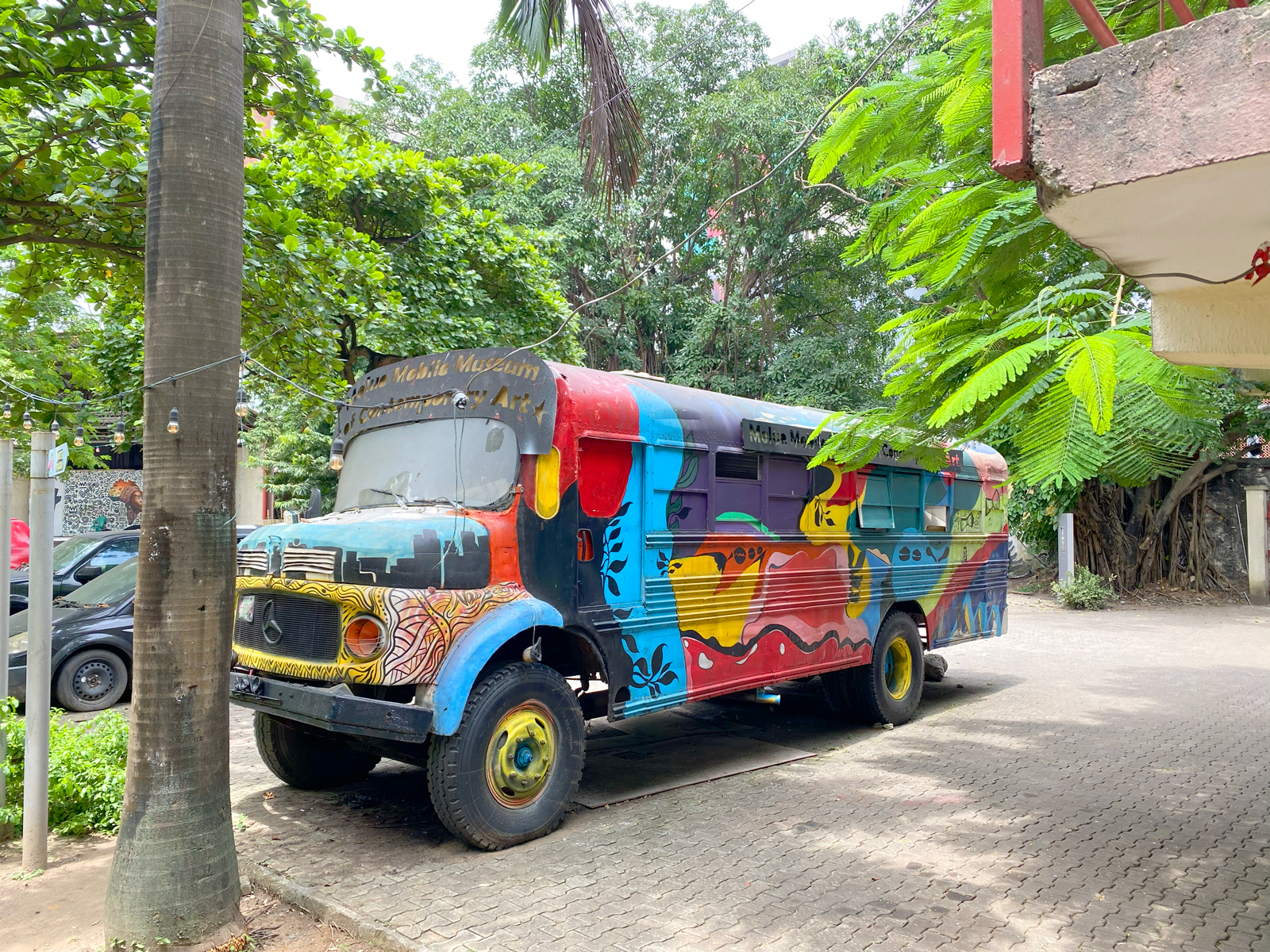
Mobile Museum of Contemporary Art

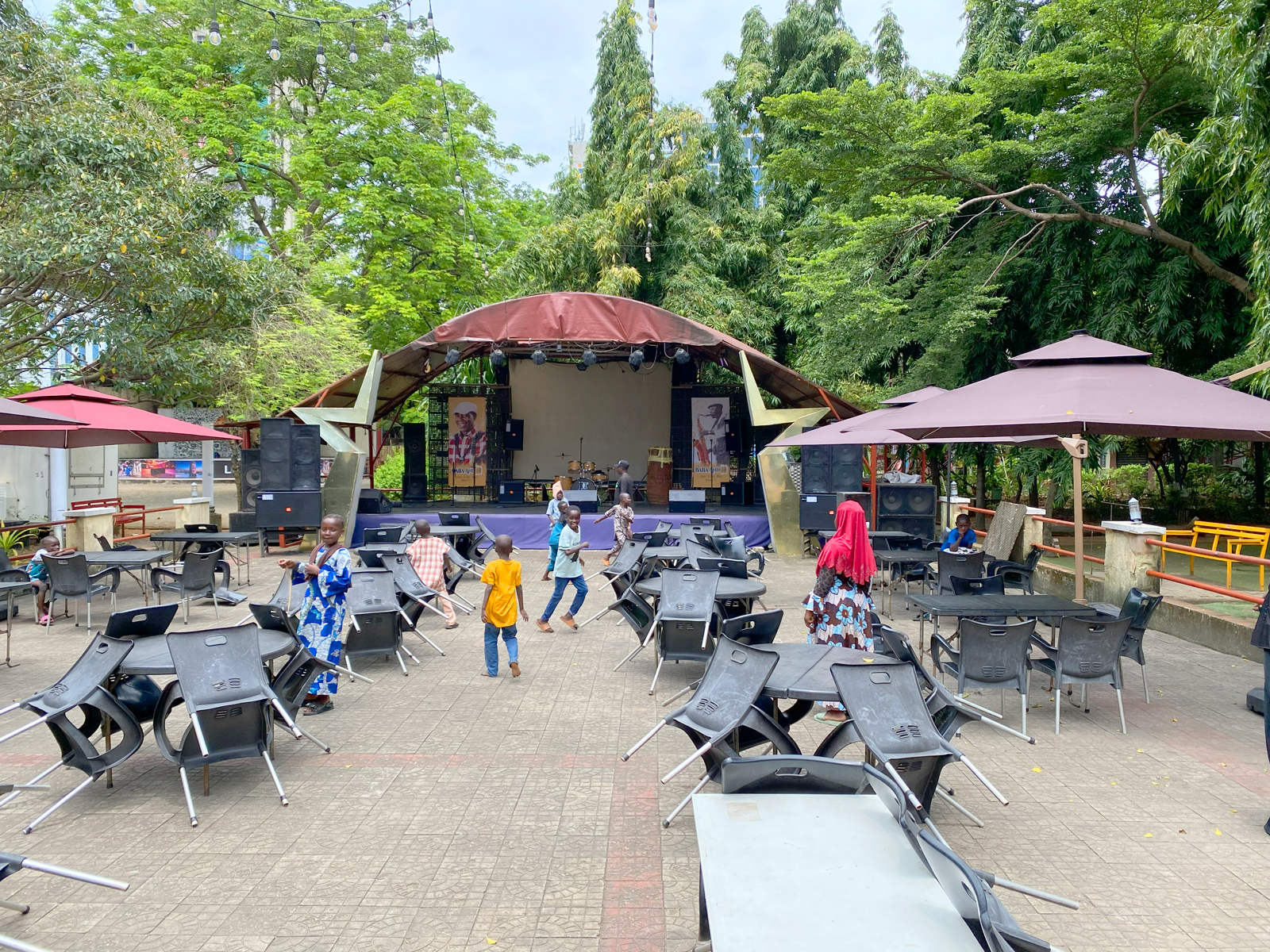
Music stage with dancing children

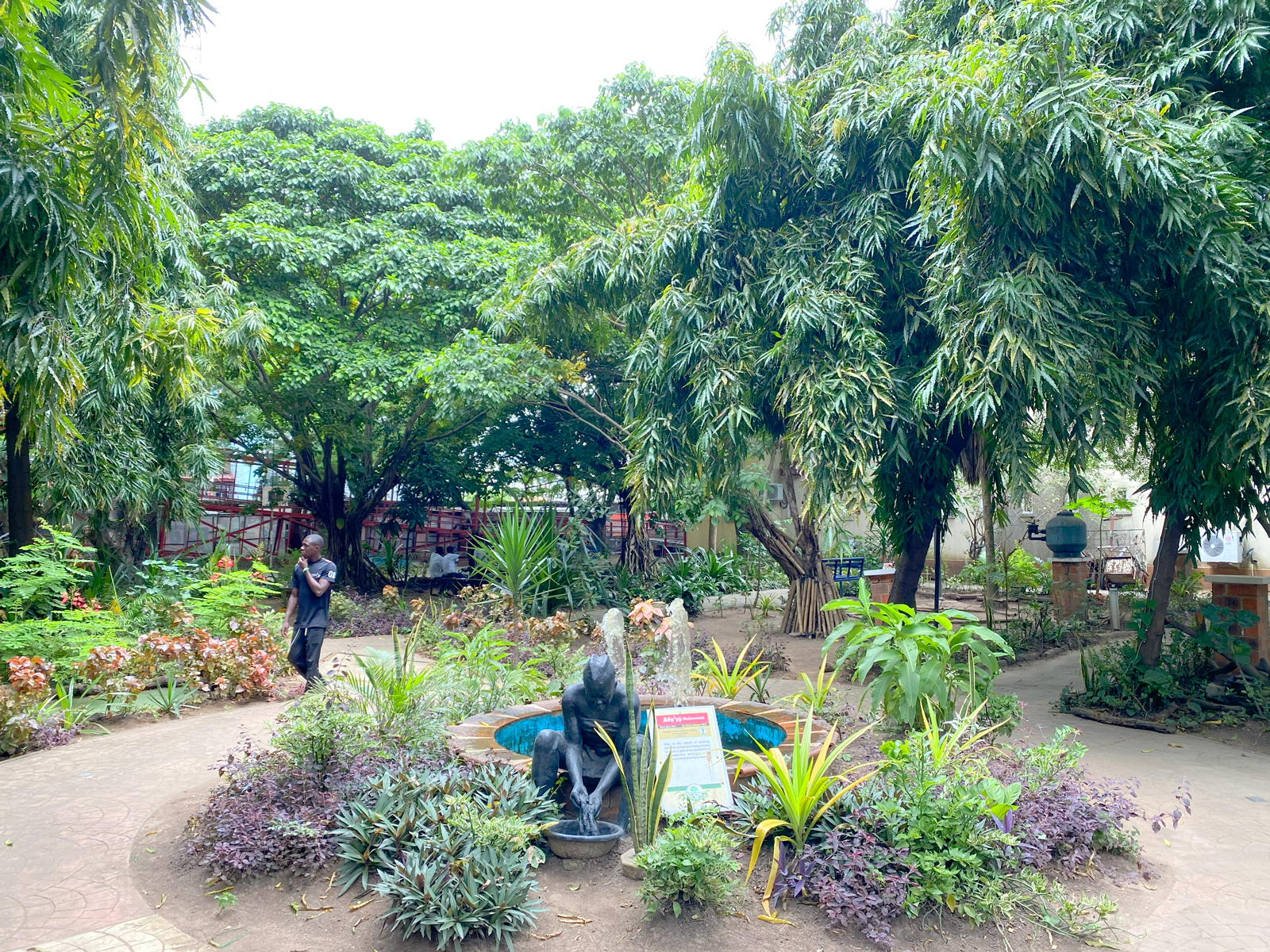
Garden with fountain

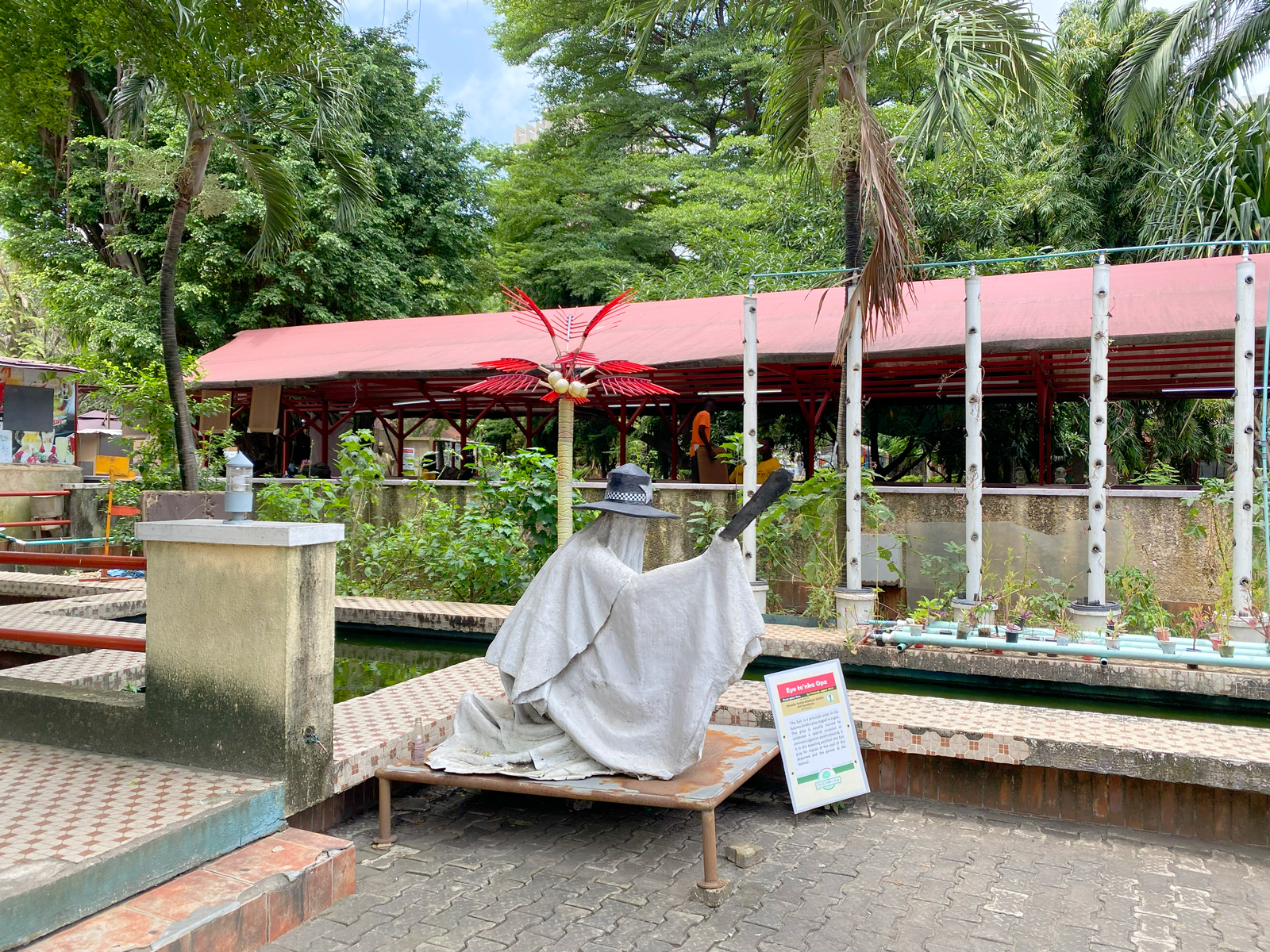
Eyo statue

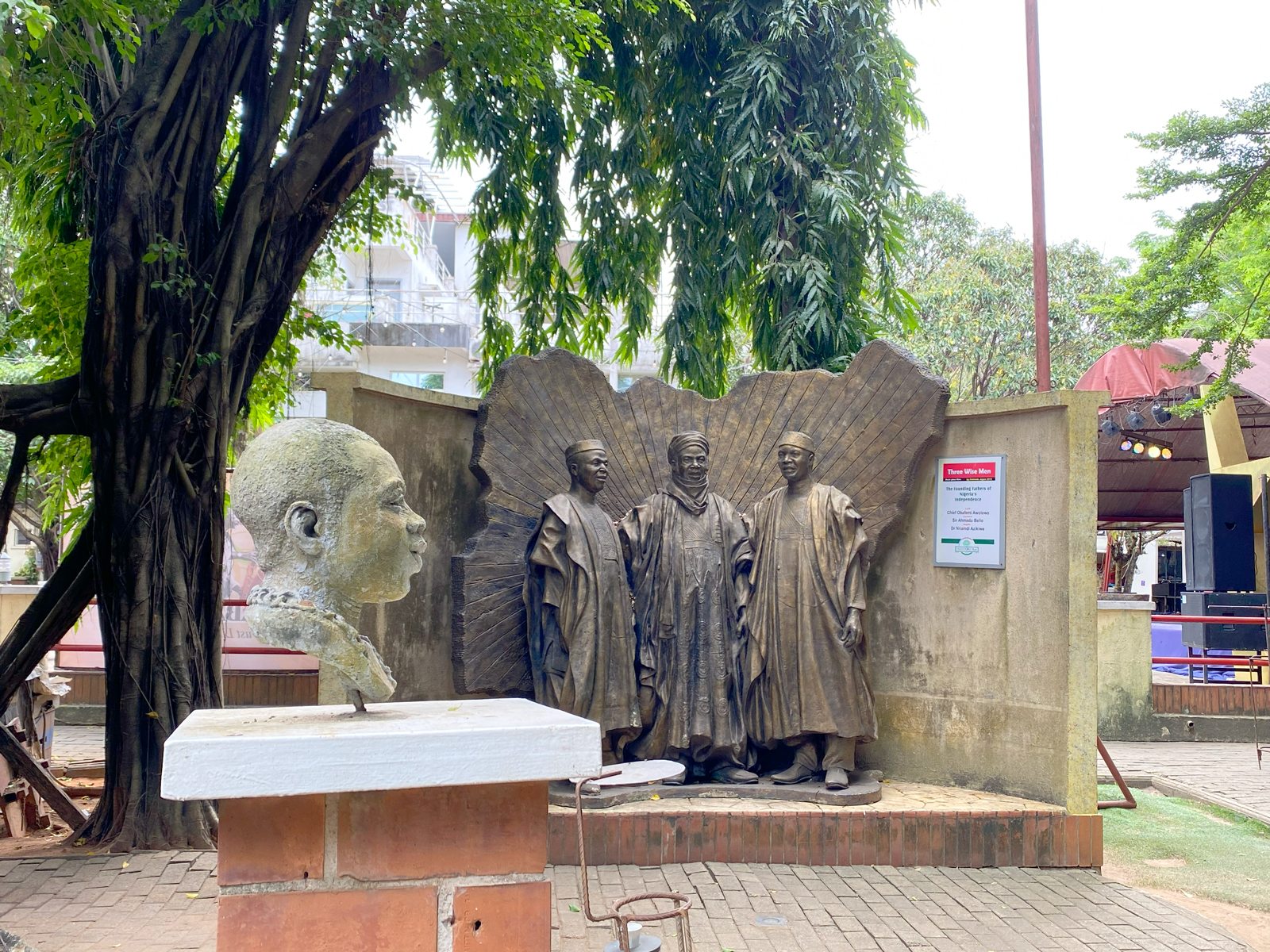
Bust of Fela Kuti, statues of Azikiwe, Bello and Awolowo

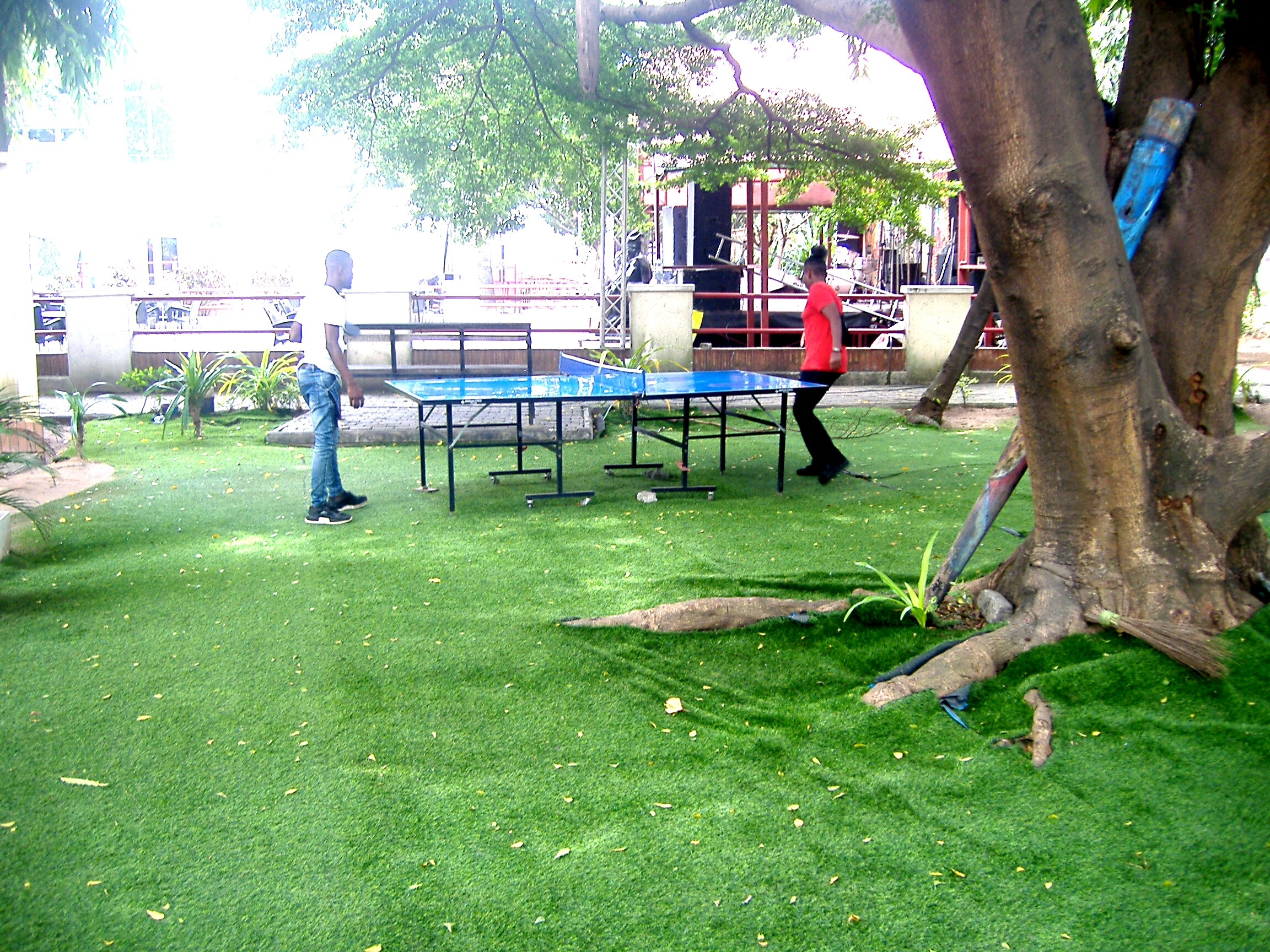
Table tennis

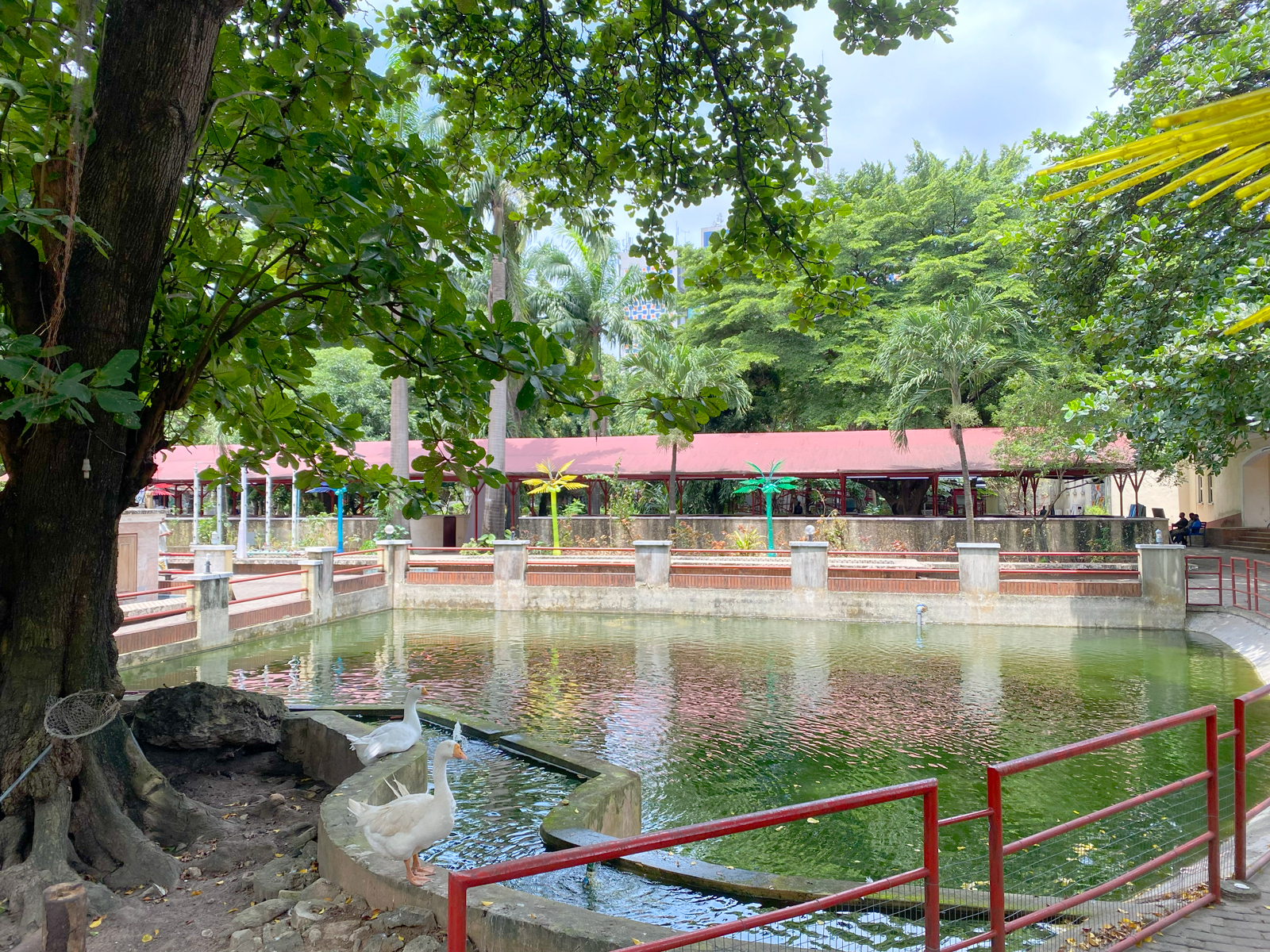
Pond

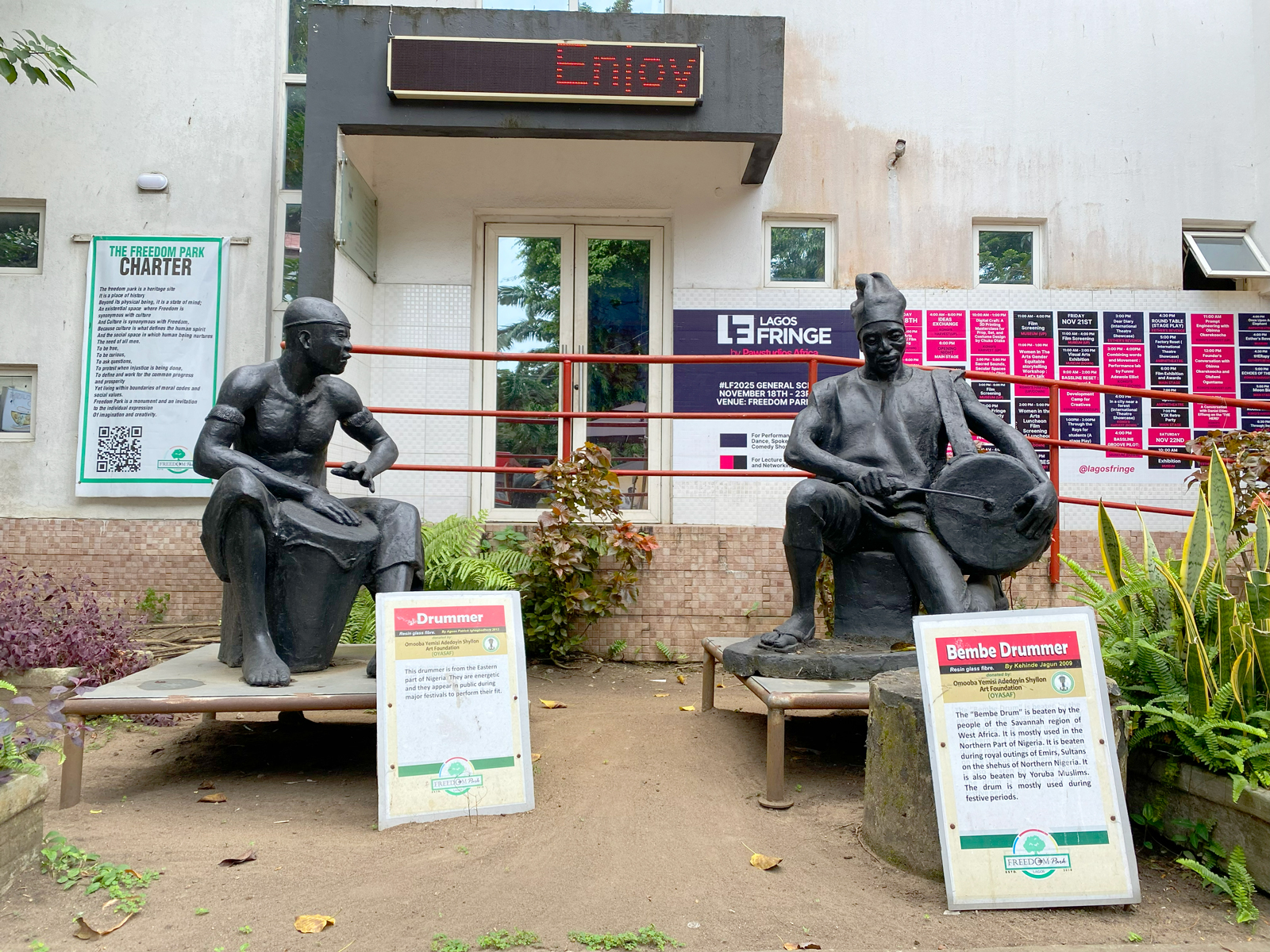
Statues of musicians

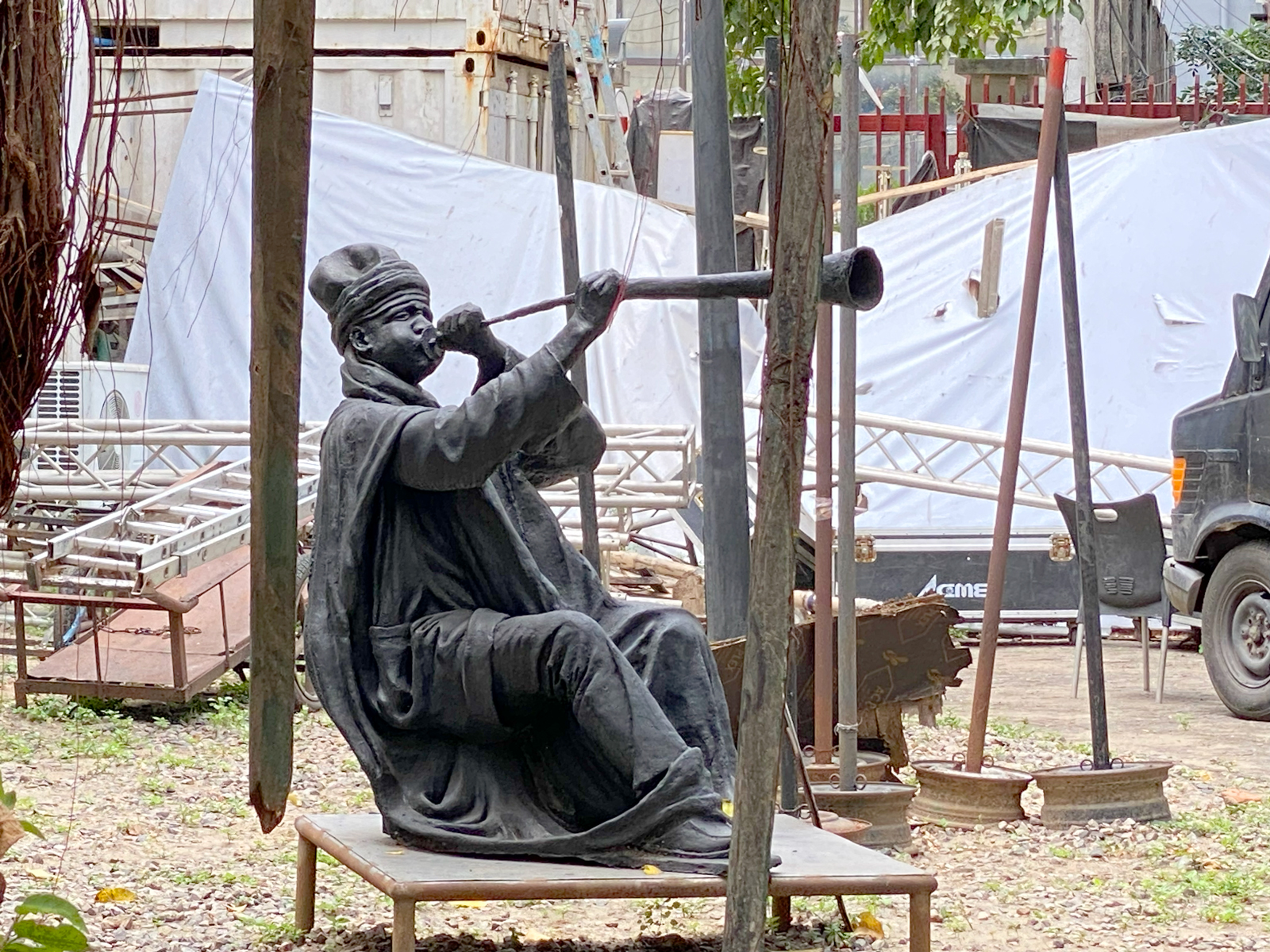
Statue of musician

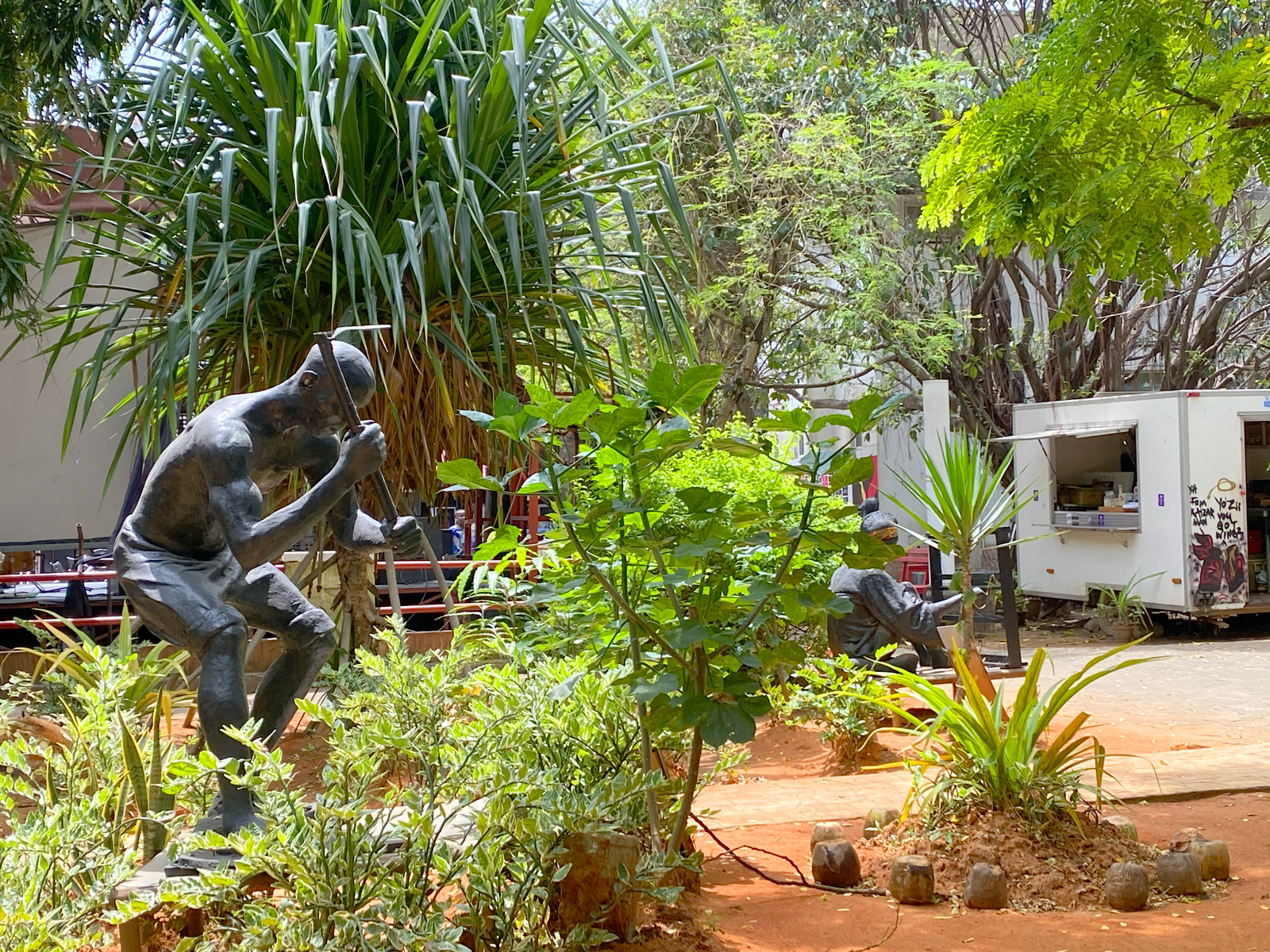
Garden with statue of farmer

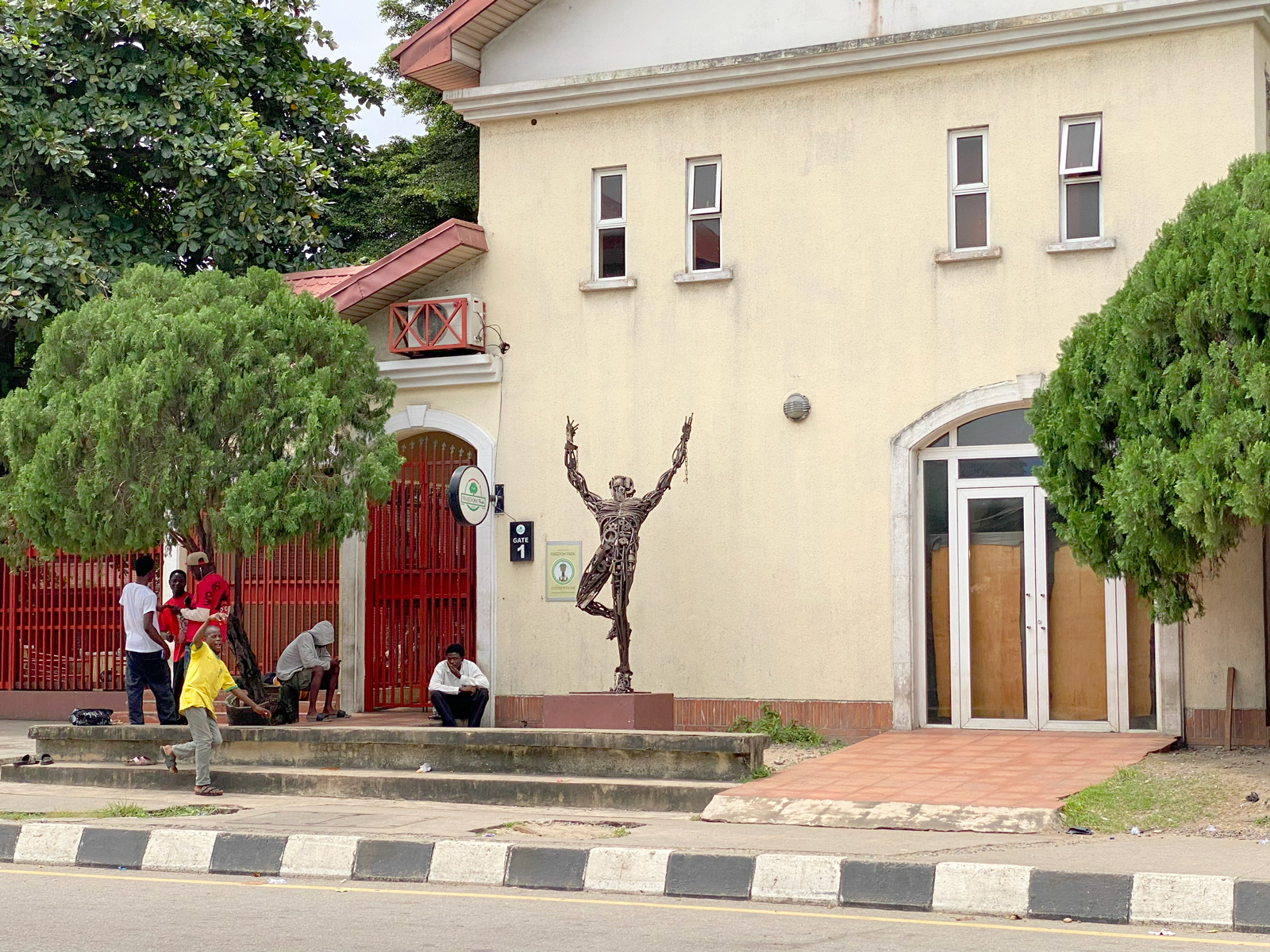
Front of Freedom Park with statue made of scrap metal

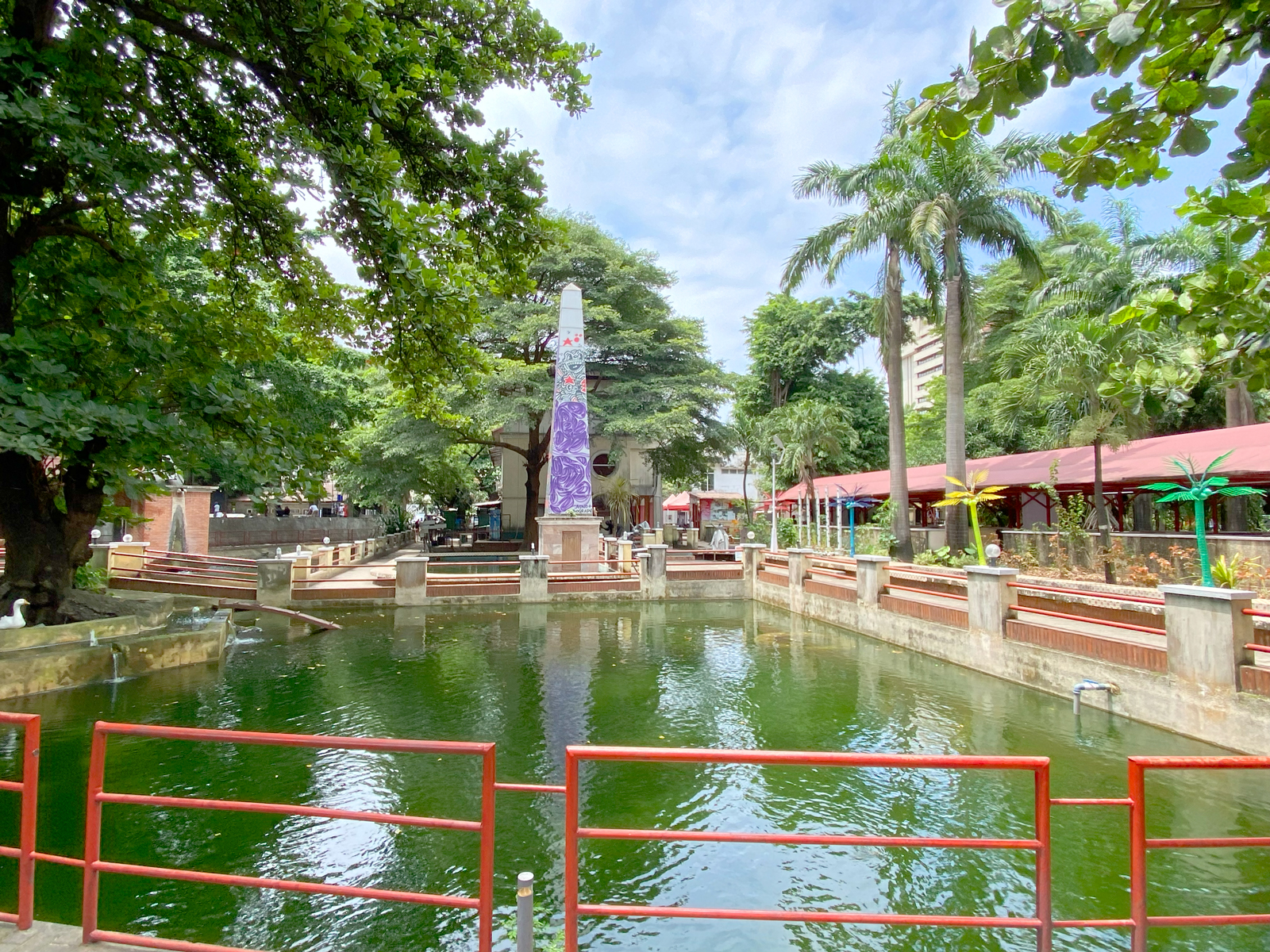
Pond

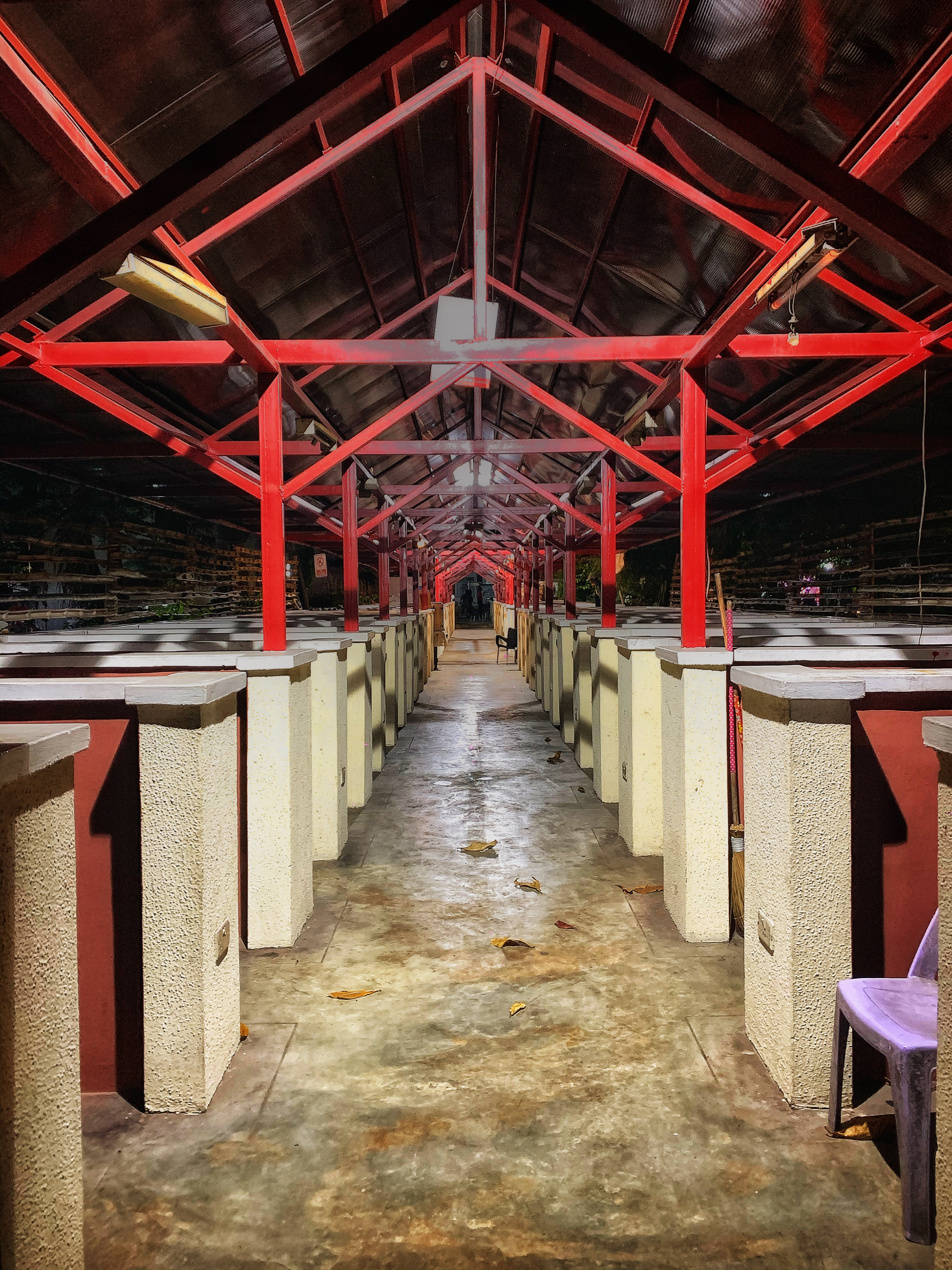

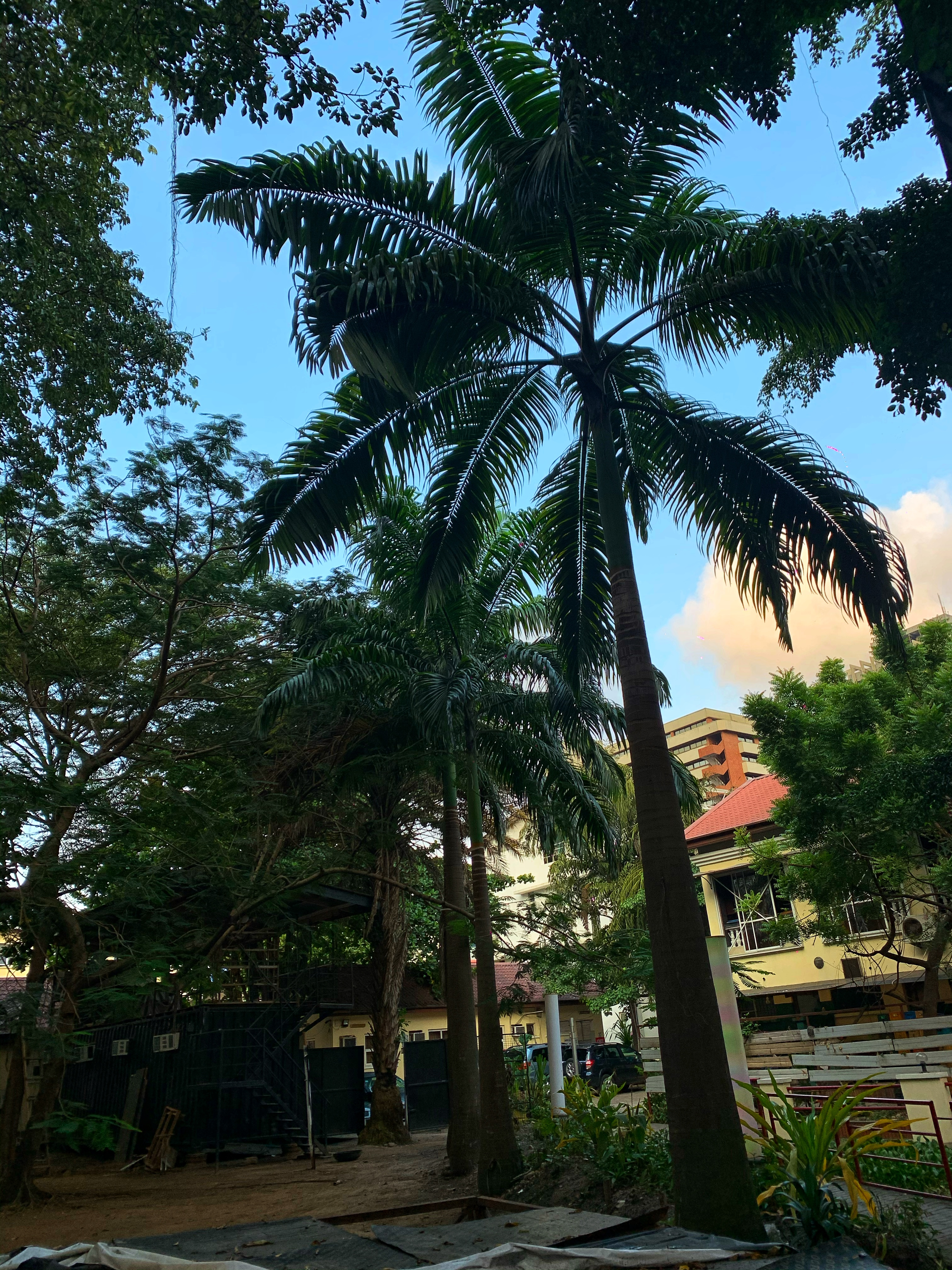

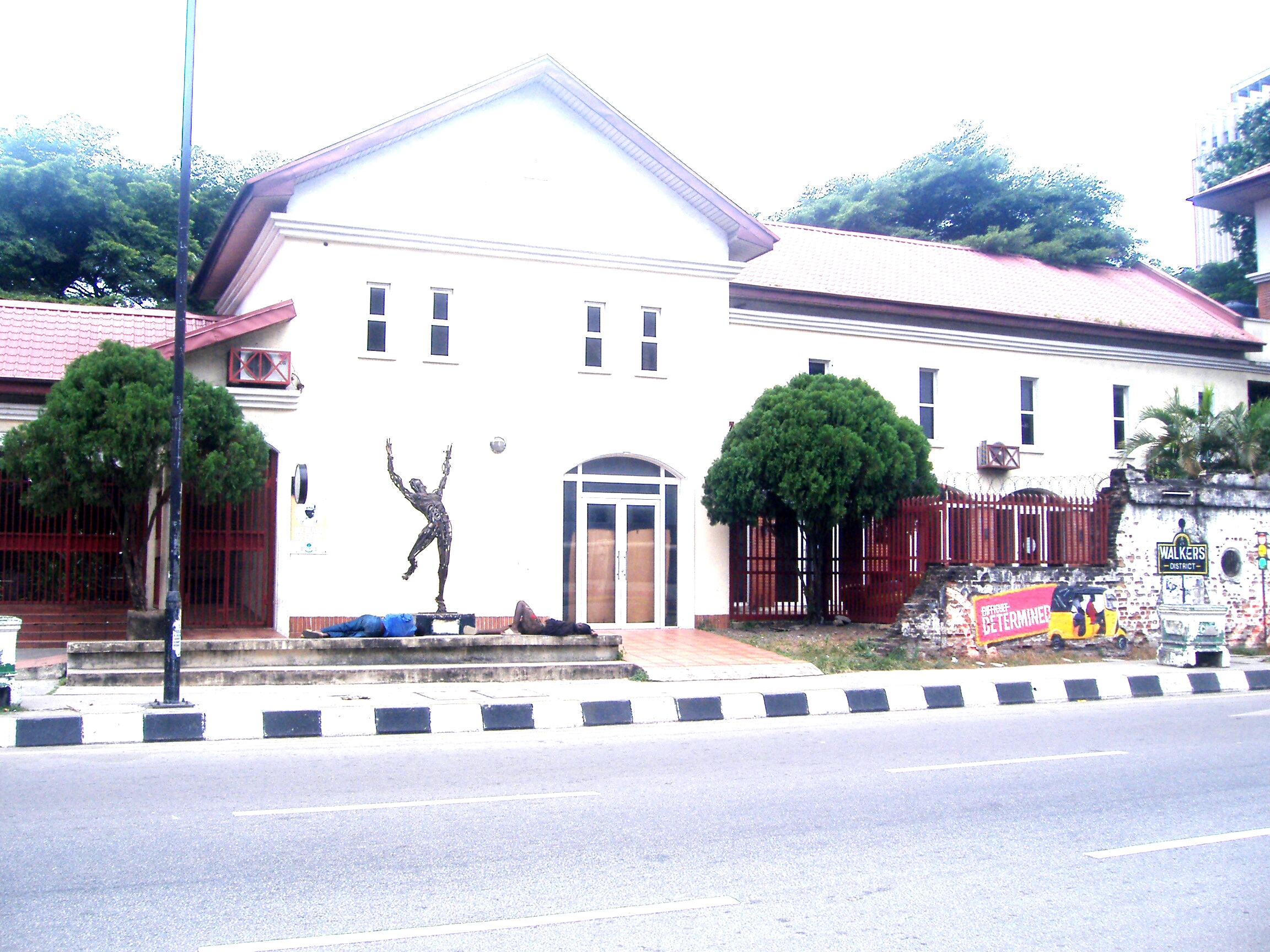

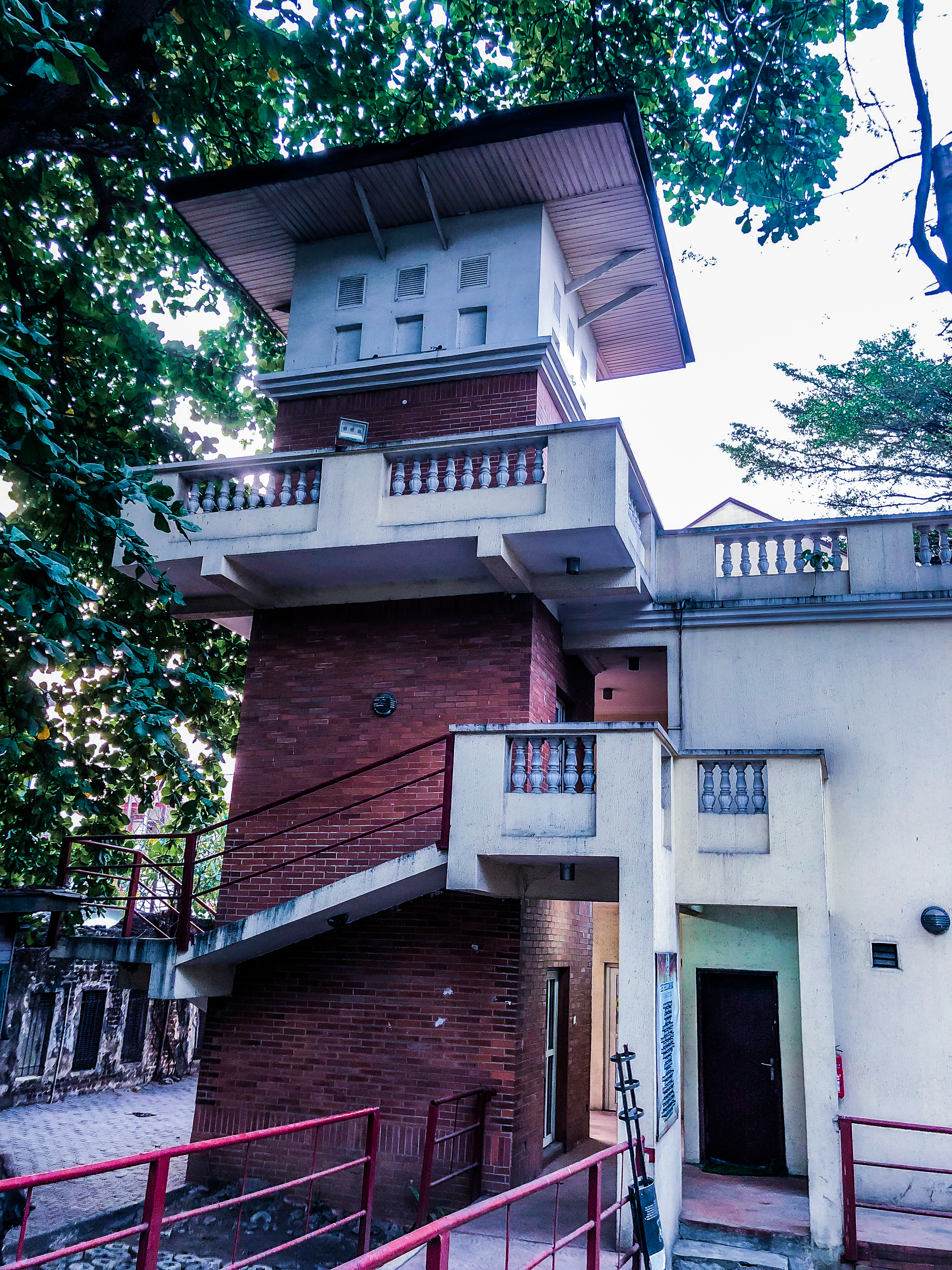
Watchtower of the former prison

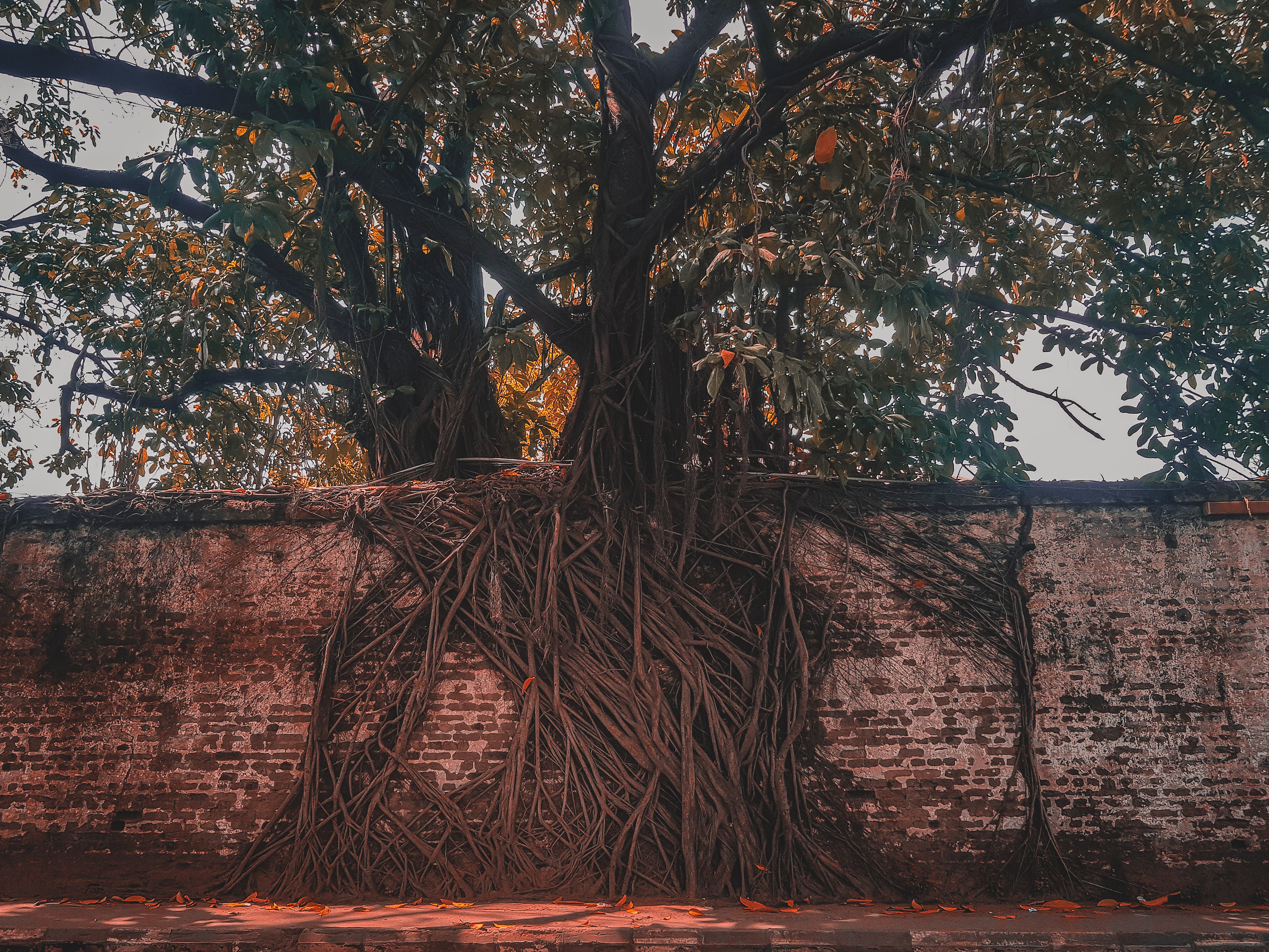
Tree on Fence at Freedom Park, Lagos

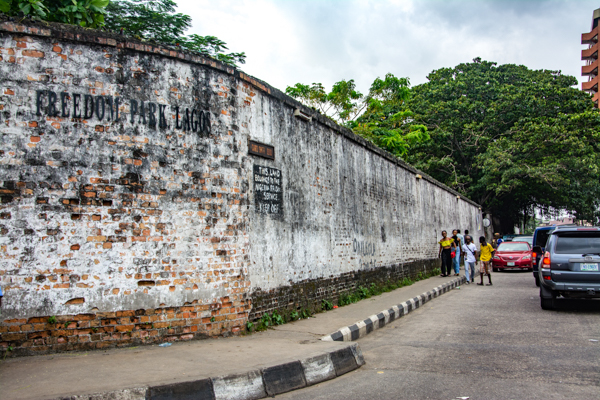
Original walls of the former prison

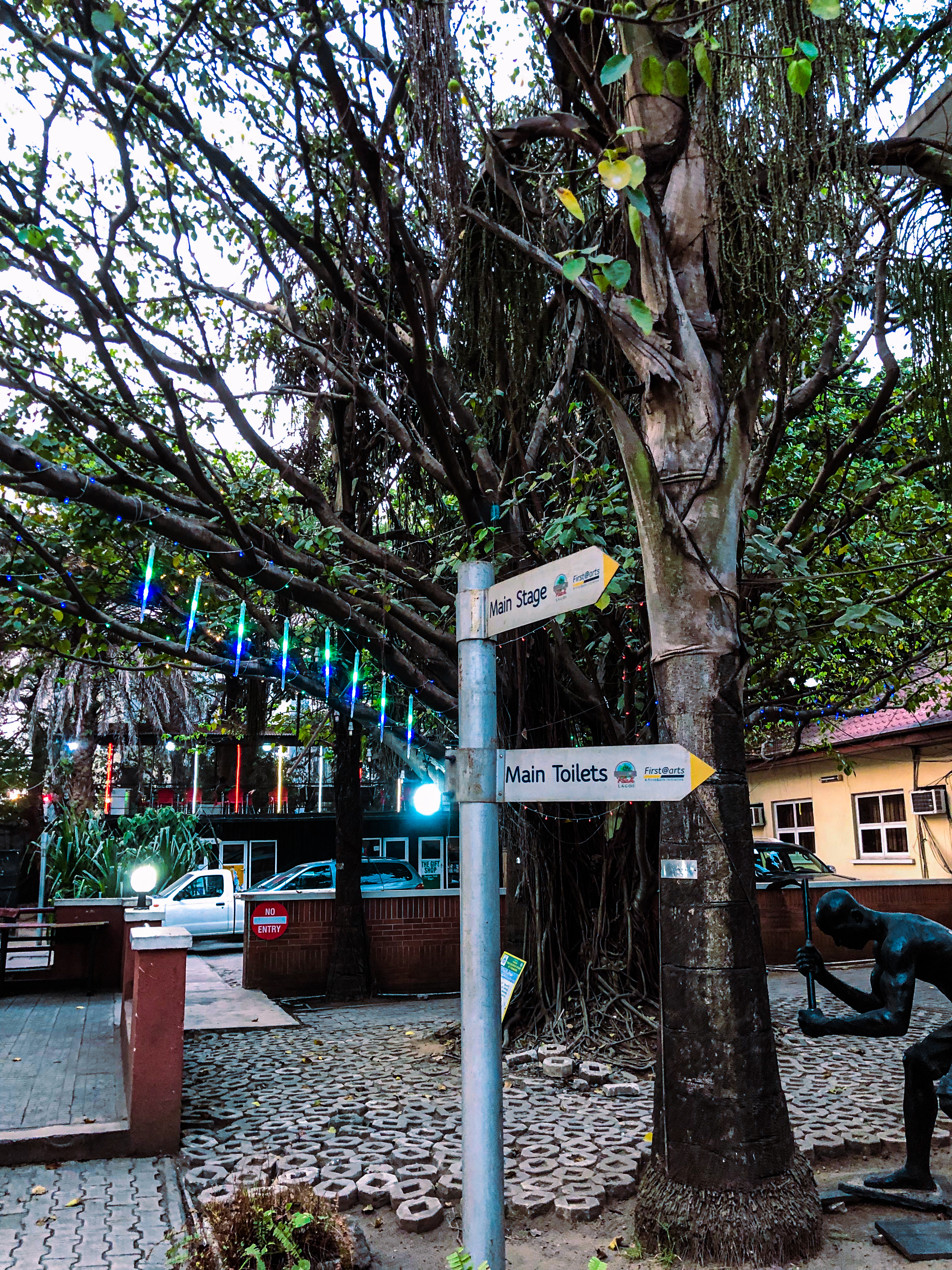
Landscape view
