= 1989 in the United States =

- Decades: 1960s; 1970s; 1980s; 1990s; 2000s
- See also: History of the United States (1980–1991); Timeline of United States history (1970–1989); List of years in the United States

Events from the year 1989 in the United States.

== Incumbents ==
=== Federal government ===
- President:

Ronald Reagan (R-California) (until January 20)
George H. W. Bush (R-Texas) (starting January 20)

- Vice President:

George H. W. Bush (R-Texas) (until January 20)
Dan Quayle (R-Indiana) (starting January 20)

- Chief Justice: William Rehnquist (Virginia)
- Speaker of the House of Representatives:

Jim Wright (D-Texas) (until June 6)
Tom Foley (D-Washington) (starting June 6)

- Senate Majority Leader:

Robert Byrd (D-West Virginia) (until January 3)
George J. Mitchell (D-Maine) (starting January 3)

- Congress: 100th (until January 3), 101st (starting January 3)

==== State governments ====
Governors and lieutenant governors

=== Governors ===
- Governor of Alabama: H. Guy Hunt (Republican)
- Governor of Alaska: Steve Cowper (Democratic)
- Governor of Arizona: Rose Mofford (Democratic)
- Governor of Arkansas: Bill Clinton (Democratic)
- Governor of California: George Deukmejian (Republican)
- Governor of Colorado: Roy Romer (Democratic)
- Governor of Connecticut: William A O'Neill (Democratic)
- Governor of Delaware: Michael Castle (Republican)
- Governor of Florida: Bob Martinez (Republican)
- Governor of Georgia: Joe Frank Harris (Democratic)
- Governor of Hawaii: John D. Waihee III (Democratic)
- Governor of Idaho: Cecil D. Andrus (Democratic)
- Governor of Illinois: James R. Thompson (Republican)
- Governor of Indiana: Robert D. Orr (Republican) (until January 9), Evan Bayh (Democratic) (starting January 9)
- Governor of Iowa: Terry E. Branstad (Republican)
- Governor of Kansas: Mike Hayden (Republican)
- Governor of Kentucky: Wallace G. Wilkinson (Democratic)
- Governor of Louisiana: Buddy Roemer (Democratic)/(Republican)
- Governor of Maine: John R. McKernan, Jr. (Republican)
- Governor of Maryland: William Donald Schaefer (Democratic)
- Governor of Massachusetts: Michael Dukakis (Democratic)
- Governor of Michigan: James Blanchard (Democratic)
- Governor of Minnesota: Rudy Perpich (Democratic)
- Governor of Mississippi: Ray Mabus (Democratic)
- Governor of Missouri: John Ashcroft (Republican)
- Governor of Montana: Ted Schwinden (Democratic) (until January 2), Stan Stephens (Republican) (starting January 2)
- Governor of Nebraska: Kay A. Orr (Republican)
- Governor of Nevada: Richard Bryan (Democratic) (until January 3), Bob Miller (Democratic) (starting January 3)
- Governor of New Hampshire: John H. Sununu (Republican) (until January 4), Judd Gregg (Republican) (starting January 4)
- Governor of New Jersey: Thomas Kean (Republican)
- Governor of New Mexico: Garrey Carruthers (Republican)
- Governor of New York: Mario Cuomo (Democratic)
- Governor of North Carolina: James G. Martin (Republican)
- Governor of North Dakota: George A. Sinner (Democratic)
- Governor of Ohio: Dick Celeste (Democratic)
- Governor of Oklahoma: Henry Bellmon (Republican)
- Governor of Oregon: Neil Goldschmidt (Democratic)
- Governor of Pennsylvania: Robert P. Casey (Democratic)
- Governor of Rhode Island: Edward D. DiPrete (Republican)
- Governor of South Carolina: Carroll A. Campbell, Jr. (Republican)
- Governor of South Dakota: George S. Mickelson (Republican)
- Governor of Tennessee: Ned McWherter (Democratic)
- Governor of Texas: Bill Clements (Republican)
- Governor of Utah: Norman H. Bangerter (Republican)
- Governor of Vermont: Madeleine M. Kunin (Democratic)
- Governor of Virginia: Gerald L. Baliles (Democratic)
- Governor of Washington: Booth Gardner (Democratic)
- Governor of West Virginia: Arch A. Moore, Jr. (Republican) (until January 16), Gaston Caperton (Democratic) (starting January 16)
- Governor of Wisconsin: Tommy Thompson (Republican)
- Governor of Wyoming: Mike Sullivan (Democratic)

=== Lieutenant governors ===
- Lieutenant Governor of Alabama: Jim Folsom, Jr. (Democratic)
- Lieutenant Governor of Alaska: Stephen McAlpine (Democratic)
- Lieutenant Governor of Arkansas: Winston Bryant (Democratic)
- Lieutenant Governor of California: Leo T. McCarthy (Democratic)
- Lieutenant Governor of Colorado: Mike Callihan (Democratic)
- Lieutenant Governor of Connecticut: Joseph J. Fauliso (Democratic)
- Lieutenant Governor of Delaware: Shien Biau Woo (Democratic) (until January 20), Dale E. Wolf (Republican) (starting January 20)
- Lieutenant Governor of Florida: Bobby Brantley (Republican)
- Lieutenant Governor of Georgia: Zell Miller (Democratic)
- Lieutenant Governor of Hawaii: Ben Cayetano (Democratic)
- Lieutenant Governor of Idaho: Butch Otter (Republican)
- Lieutenant Governor of Illinois: George H. Ryan (Republican)
- Lieutenant Governor of Indiana: John Mutz (Republican) (until January 9), Frank O'Bannon (Democratic) (starting January 9)
- Lieutenant Governor of Iowa: Jo Ann Zimmerman (Democratic)
- Lieutenant Governor of Kansas: Jack D. Walker (Republican)
- Lieutenant Governor of Kentucky: Brereton Jones (Democratic)
- Lieutenant Governor of Louisiana: Paul Hardy (Republican)
- Lieutenant Governor of Maryland: Melvin A. Steinberg (Democratic)
- Lieutenant Governor of Massachusetts: Evelyn Murphy (Democratic)
- Lieutenant Governor of Michigan: Martha W. Griffiths (Democratic)
- Lieutenant Governor of Minnesota: Marlene Johnson (Democratic)
- Lieutenant Governor of Mississippi: Brad Dye (Democratic)
- Lieutenant Governor of Missouri: Harriett Woods (Democratic) (until January 9), Mel Carnahan (Democratic) (starting January 9)
- Lieutenant Governor of Montana: Gordon McOmber (Democratic) (until January 2), Allen Kolstad (Republican) (starting January 2)
- Lieutenant Governor of Nebraska: William E. Nichol (Republican)
- Lieutenant Governor of Nevada: Bob Miller (Democratic) (until January 3), vacant (starting January 3)
- Lieutenant Governor of New Mexico: Jack L. Stahl (Republican)
- Lieutenant Governor of New York: Stan Lundine (Democratic)
- Lieutenant Governor of North Carolina: Robert B. Jordan, III (Democratic) (until January 7), James Carson Gardner (Republican) (starting January 7)
- Lieutenant Governor of North Dakota: Lloyd Omdahl (Democratic)
- Lieutenant Governor of Ohio: Paul R. Leonard (Democratic)
- Lieutenant Governor of Oklahoma: Robert S. Kerr III (Democratic)
- Lieutenant Governor of Pennsylvania: Mark Singel (Democratic)
- Lieutenant Governor of Rhode Island: Richard A. Licht (Democratic) (until month and day unknown), Roger N. Begin (Democratic) (starting month and day unknown)
- Lieutenant Governor of South Carolina: Nick Theodore (Democratic)
- Lieutenant Governor of South Dakota: Walter Dale Miller (Republican)
- Lieutenant Governor of Tennessee: John S. Wilder (Democratic)
- Lieutenant Governor of Texas: William P. Hobby, Jr. (Democratic)
- Lieutenant Governor of Utah: W. Val Oveson (Republican)
- Lieutenant Governor of Vermont: Howard Dean (Democratic)
- Lieutenant Governor of Virginia: Douglas Wilder (Democratic)
- Lieutenant Governor of Washington: John Cherberg (Democratic) (until January 11), Joel Pritchard (Republican) (starting January 11)
- Lieutenant Governor of Wisconsin: Scott McCallum (Republican)

== Events ==
=== January ===
January 20: George H. W. Bush becomes the 41st U.S. president

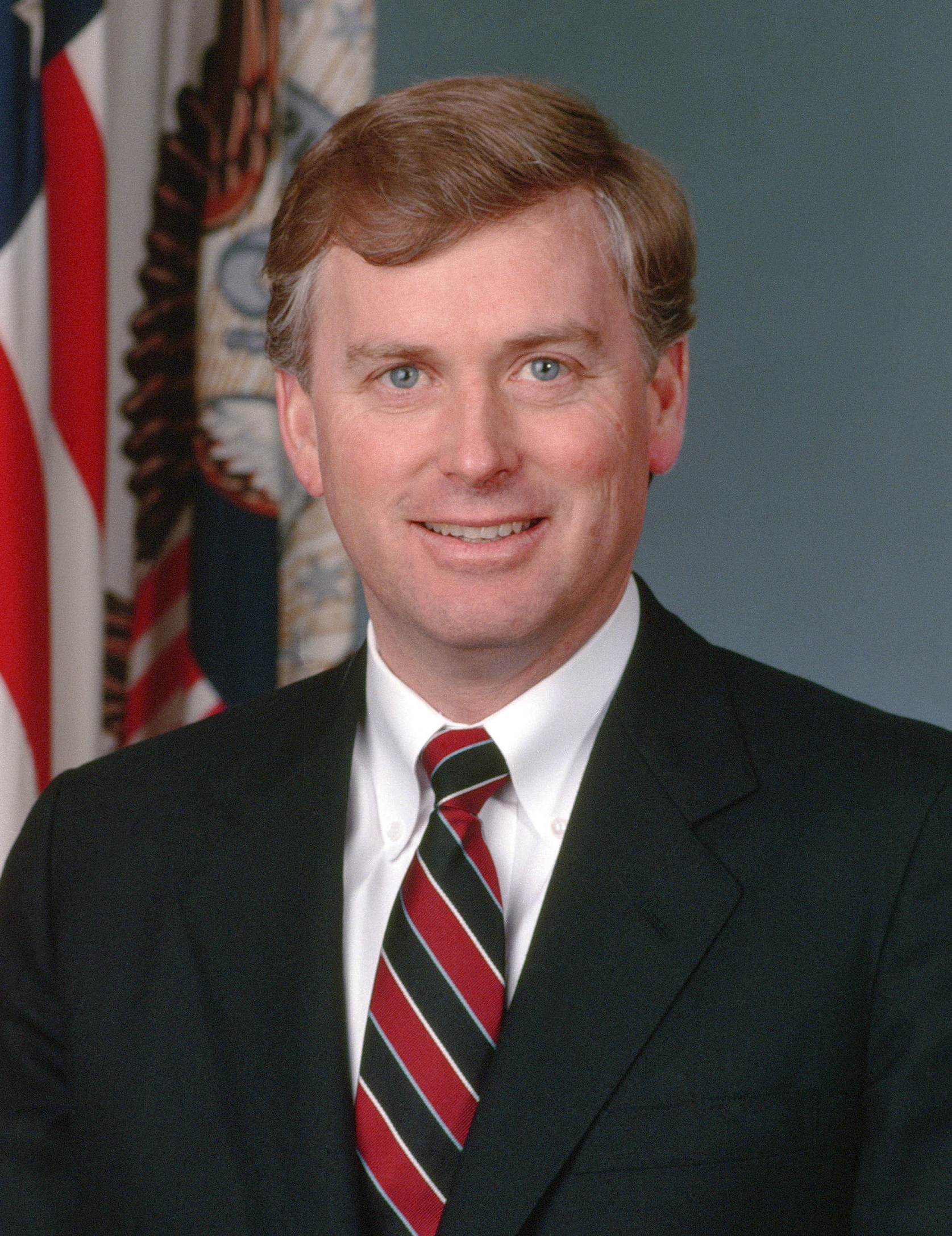
January 20: Dan Quayle becomes the 44th U.S. vice president

- January 1 – The Canada–United States Free Trade Agreement comes into effect.
- January 4 – Second Gulf of Sidra incident: Two Libyan MiG-23 "Floggers" are engaged and shot down by two United States Navy F-14 Tomcats.
- January 10 – Harris Trust and Savings Bank of Chicago settles a government enforcement action by agreeing to pay $14 million in backpay to women and minorities, the largest such settlement ever obtained from a single employer.
- January 11
  - President Ronald Reagan delivers his farewell address to the nation.
  - The National Collegiate Athletic Association adopts Proposition 42, which withdraws athletic scholarships from athletes who fail to meet minimal academic standards.
- January 12 – President-elect George H. W. Bush announces the final members of his cabinet, naming James D. Watkins as Secretary of Energy and William Bennett as the first director of the Office of National Drug Control Policy.
- January 13 – Bernhard Goetz is sentenced to one year in prison and fined $5,000 for shooting four young men on the New York subway in 1984.
- January 16 – A Hispanic Miami police officer shoots and kills a speeding black motorcyclist in the Overtown section of Miami, Florida, starting three days of rioting.
- January 17 – Stockton schoolyard shooting: Patrick Edward Purdy kills five children, wounds 30 and then shoots himself in Stockton, California.
- January 18 – The Republican National Committee elects Lee Atwater as its chairman.
- January 20 – George H. W. Bush is sworn in as the 41st president of the United States, and Dan Quayle is sworn in as the 44th vice president.
- January 22 – The San Francisco 49ers defeat the Cincinnati Bengals in Super Bowl XXIII.
- January 24
  - Serial killer Ted Bundy is executed in Florida's electric chair.
  - Joel Steinberg is convicted of manslaughter in the beating death of a 6-year-old child he was raising.
- January 29 – Shining Time Station, a children's sitcom debuts on PBS. Starring Didi Conn, Brian O'Connor and Ringo Starr, the series introduces British children's television series Thomas the Tank Engine & Friends to America.
- January 31 – Northway, Alaska records the highest mean sea level pressure on record in the United States with a reading of 31.85 inHg (1078.6 millibars)

=== February ===
- February 7
  - The Los Angeles, California City Council bans the sale or possession of semiautomatic weapons.
  - The 101st United States Congress rejects a proposed 51 percent pay raise for its members, federal judges, and certain other high-ranking government officials.
- February 9 – President Bush delivers his first address to the 101st Congress.
- February 10
  - Ron Brown is elected chairman of the Democratic National Committee, becoming the first African American to lead a major United States political party.
  - President Bush meets with Prime Minister of Canada Brian Mulroney in Ottawa, laying the groundwork for the Acid Rain Treaty of 1991.
- February 11 – Barbara Harris is the first woman consecrated as a bishop of the Episcopal Church in the United States of America.
- February 14 – The first of 24 Global Positioning System satellites is placed into orbit.
- February 23 – After protracted testimony, the U.S. Senate Armed Services Committee rejects, 11–9, President Bush's nomination of John Tower for Secretary of Defense.
- February 23–27 – U.S. President Bush visits Japan, China, and South Korea, attending the funeral of Hirohito and then meeting with China's Deng Xiaoping and South Korea's Roh Tae-woo.
- February 26 – 60 Minutes in the United States airs a report claiming that apples sprayed with Alar may cause cancer in children, leading many schools to remove apples from their cafeterias.

=== March ===
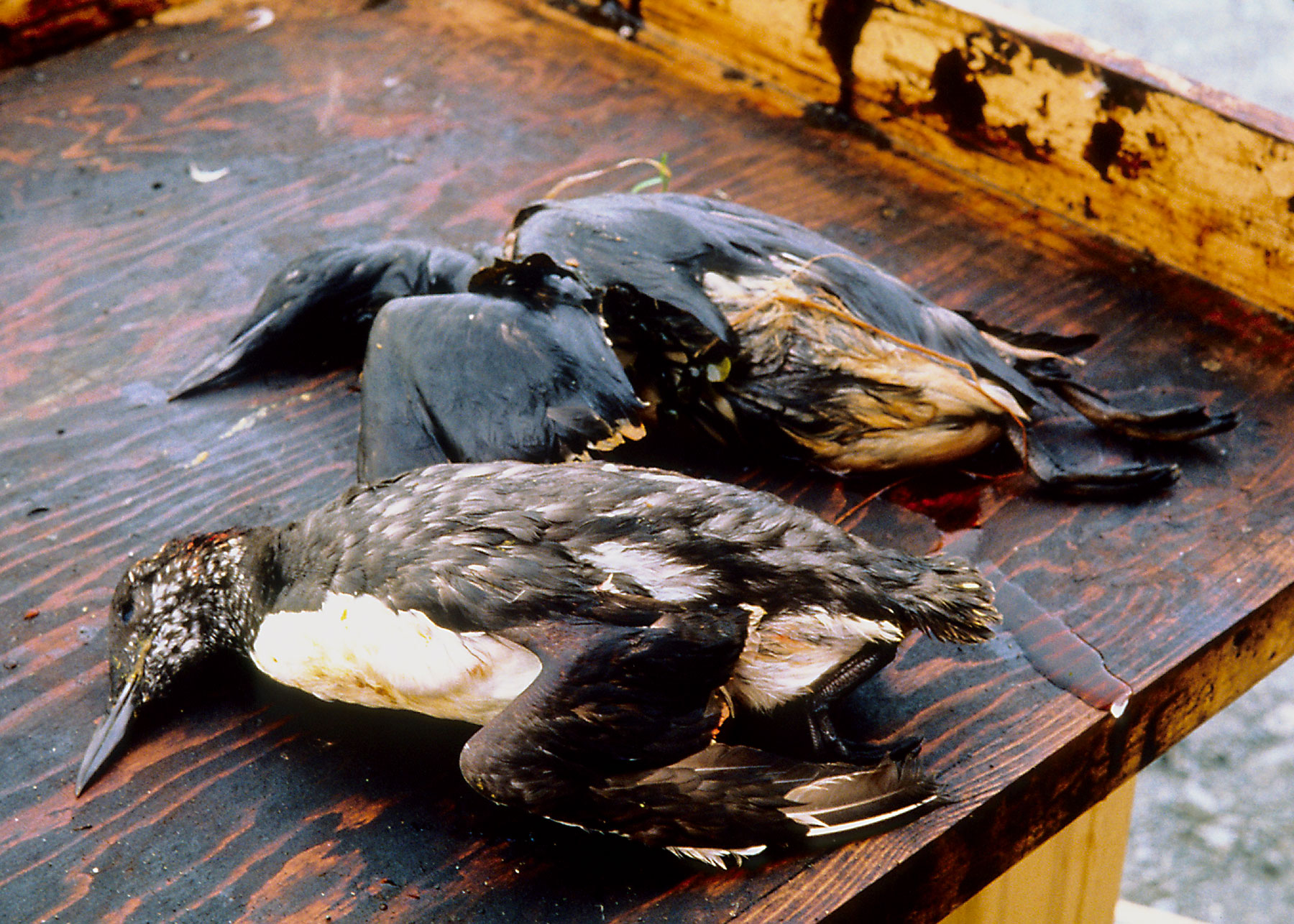
March 24: Exxon Valdez oil spill

- March – The unemployment rate drops to a low of 5.0%, the lowest since December 1973.
- March 1
  - The Berne Convention, an international treaty on copyrights, is ratified by the United States.
  - Louis W. Sullivan starts his term of office as U.S. Secretary of Health and Human Services.
  - James D. Watkins starts his term of office as U.S. Secretary of Energy.
- March 3 – Former National Security Advisor Robert McFarlane is fined $20,000 and given two years' probation for misleading Congress about the Iran–Contra affair.
- March 4
  - Time Inc. and Warner Communications announce plans for a merger, forming Time Warner.
  - Eastern Air Lines machinists and baggage workers walk off the job to protest pay cuts. The airline subsequently filed for bankruptcy protection five days later, on March 9.
- March 9 – By a vote of 53 to 47, the Senate votes to reject the nomination of John Tower as United States Secretary of Defense. President Bush subsequently nominated Dick Cheney the next day, and Cheney was confirmed and sworn in as defense secretary on March 17.
- March 13 – A geomagnetic storm causes the collapse of the Hydro-Québec power grid. 6 million people are left without power for 9 hours. Some areas in the northeastern U.S. and in Sweden also lose power, and aurorae are seen as far as Texas.
- March 13–17 – The Food and Drug Administration bans the import of grapes from Chile after traces of cyanide are found in two grapes.
- March 13–18 – The Space Shuttle Discovery flies mission STS-29.
- March 14 – Gun control: U.S. President George H. W. Bush bans the importation of certain guns deemed assault weapons into the United States.
- March 15 – The United States Department of Veterans Affairs becomes established.
- March 20 – Dick Cheney is sworn in as the new Secretary of Defense, succeeding Frank Carlucci.
- March 22
  - Congress passes a bill to protect the job of whistle blowers who expose government waste or fraud.
  - National Football League commissioner Pete Rozelle, commissioner since 1960, announces he will step down when a replacement is found.
  - Clint Malarchuk of the NHL Buffalo Sabres suffers an almost fatal injury when another player accidentally slits his throat.
- March 23 – Stanley Pons and Martin Fleischmann announce that they have achieved cold fusion at the University of Utah.
- March 24 – Exxon Valdez oil spill: In Alaska's Prince William Sound the Exxon Valdez spills 240,000 barrels (38,000 m^{3}) of oil after running aground.
- March 29 – The 61st Academy Awards, the first since 1971 with no official host are held at the Shrine Auditorium in Los Angeles, California, with Barry Levinson's Rain Man winning four awards out of eight nominations, including Best Picture and Best Director. The television broadcast is the most-viewed in Oscar history until 1998, garnering nearly 43 million viewers.

=== April ===
- April 1 – Bill White becomes president of baseball's National League, becoming the first African American to head a major sports league.
- April 2 – The World Wrestling Federation holds WrestleMania V from the Atlantic City Convention Hall (Promoted as Trump Plaza) in Atlantic City, New Jersey.
- April 3
  - The Michigan Wolverines men's basketball team defeats the Seton Hall Pirates men's basketball team to win the 1989 NCAA Men's Division I Basketball Tournament.
  - Richard M. Daley is elected Mayor of Chicago.
- April 5 – Beginning of the Pittston Coal strike after miners had worked 14 months without a contract.
- April 9 – More than 300,000 demonstrators march in Washington, D.C. in support of legal abortion in the United States.
- April 14 – The U.S. government seizes the Irving, California Lincoln Savings and Loan Association; Charles Keating (for whom the Keating Five were named – John McCain among them) eventually goes to jail, as part of the massive 1980s Savings and loan crisis which costs U.S. taxpayers nearly $200 billion in bailouts, and many people their life savings.
- April 17 – The House Committee on Standards of Official Conduct charges House Speaker Jim Wright with improperly evading limits on outside income and accepting improper gifts.
- April 19
  - Trisha Meili is attacked while jogging in New York City's Central Park; as her identity remains secret for years, she becomes known as the "Central Park Jogger."
  - A gun turret explodes on the U.S. battleship Iowa, killing 47 crew members.
- April 20 – NATO debates modernizing short range missiles; although the U.S. and U.K. are in favor, West German Chancellor Helmut Kohl obtains a concession deferring a decision.

=== May ===
- May 1 – Disney-MGM Studios at Walt Disney World opens to the public for the first time.
- May 4
  - In the trial of Oliver North on charges related to the Iran–Contra affair, the jury finds North guilty of three criminal charges and not guilty of nine.
  - STS-30 was launched, deploying the Venus-bound Magellan probe.
- May 8 – STS-30 lands at Edwards Air Force Base in California after four days of its mission and the successful deployment of a Venus spacecraft.
- May 12 – A Southern Pacific Railroad freight train crashes on Duffy Street in San Bernardino, California.
- May 15–25 – Los Angeles schoolteachers go on strike. The strike ends with the teachers gaining more administrative control and a 24% pay raise.
- May 19 – The Dow Jones Industrial Average closes above 2,500 for the first time since Black Monday (1987).
- May 25 – Thirteen days after the Southern Pacific train derailment, the Calnev Pipeline explodes at the same section of Duffy Street in San Bernardino, California.
- May 26 – United States House of Representatives Majority Whip Tony Coelho resigns from the United States House of Representatives, saying he wants to spare his family from an investigation into his finances.
- May 31 – Jim Wright announces his resignation as Speaker of the House of Representatives.

=== June ===
- June 4 – Jerome Robbins' Broadway wins the Tony Award for Best Musical and five other Tonys.
- June 6 – The United States House of Representatives elects Tom Foley as its new speaker.
- June 12 – The Corcoran Gallery of Art cancels Robert Mapplethorpe's photography exhibition, "Robert Mapplethorpe: The Perfect Moment", due to its sexually explicit content.
- June 13
  - The Detroit Pistons beat the Los Angeles Lakers to win the 1989 NBA Finals.
  - President Bush vetoes a minimum-wage bill passed by Congress on May 17 that would have increased the minimum wage to $4.55 an hour.
- June 14 – A Titan IV blasts off from Cape Canaveral Air Force Station.
- June 21 – In Texas v. Johnson, the United States Supreme Court rules that burning the Flag of the United States is protected speech under the First Amendment to the United States Constitution.
- June 23 – The film Batman opens on general release, to massive anticipation, following the Pop Culture phenomenon known as “Batmania”. It earned more than $40 million in its first weekend, a box office record.
- June 23–24 – Three shipping accidents in a 12-hour period create oil spills in Rhode Island, Delaware and Texas.
- June 26 – In Penry v. Lynaugh, the Supreme Court rules that states can execute murderers as young as 16 or who are mentally challenged.
- June 27 – A federal appeals court overturns the February 1988 conviction of Lyn Nofziger for illegal lobbying.

=== July ===
- July 3 – In Webster v. Reproductive Health Services, the Supreme Court gives the states new authority to restrict abortions.
- July 5
  - The television show Seinfeld premieres.
  - Oliver North is fined $150,000, and given a two-year suspended sentence and three years probation and ordered to perform 1,200 hours of community service for his crimes in the Iran-contra affair.
- July 9–12 – U.S. President George H. W. Bush travels to Poland and Hungary, pushing for U.S. economic aid and investment.
- July 17 – Maiden flight of the B-2 stealth bomber.
- July 18 – Actress Rebecca Schaeffer is murdered by obsessed fan Robert John Bardo, leading to stricter stalking laws in California.
- July 19 – United Airlines Flight 232 (Douglas DC-10) crashes in Sioux City, Iowa, killing 112; 184 on board survive.
- July 21 – The Dow Jones Industrial Average closes above 2,600 for the first time since Black Monday (1987).
- July 26 – A federal grand jury indicts Cornell University student Robert Tappan Morris, Jr. for releasing a computer virus, making him the first person to be prosecuted under the 1986 Computer Fraud and Abuse Act.
- July 31 – Nintendo's Game Boy is released in North America.

=== August ===
- August 5 – Congress passes the Financial Institutions Reform, Recovery, and Enforcement Act of 1989, which is signed into law by President Bush on August 9. The act provides a $166-billion bailout to failed savings and loans and overhauls regulation of the industry.
- August 7
  - U.S. Representative Mickey Leland (D-TX) and 15 others die in a plane crash in Ethiopia.
  - Federal Express purchases Flying Tiger Line for approximately $800 million.
- August 8 – STS-28: Space Shuttle Columbia takes off on a secret 5-day military mission.
- August 10 – President Bush nominates United States Army Gen. Colin Powell as Chairman of the Joint Chiefs of Staff, making him the first African American to hold that position.
- August 16–17 – Woodstock '89 festival.
- August 20 – In Beverly Hills, California, Lyle and Erik Menendez shoot their wealthy parents to death in the family's den.
- August 22 – Nolan Ryan becomes the first pitcher in the history of Major League Baseball to get 5,000 strikeouts.
- August 23 – Yusef Hawkins is shot in the Bensonhurst section of Brooklyn, New York, sparking racial tensions between African Americans and Italian Americans.
- August 24
  - Record-setting baseball player Pete Rose agrees to a lifetime ban from the sport following allegations of illegal gambling, thereby preventing his induction into the Baseball Hall of Fame.
  - The Dow Jones Industrial Average ends the day at 2,734.64, its highest closing since Black Monday (1987).
- August 27 – A Delta II rocket owned by McDonnell Douglas launches a television satellite, the first time a privately owned rocket had orbited a payload.
- August 28 – The World Wrestling Federation holds its SummerSlam event from the Brendan Byrne Arena in East Rutherford, New Jersey.
- August 29 – Harry Zych, a diver and salvager, files a lawsuit to gain ownership of the wreck of the Lady Elgin which he has recently discovered in Lake Michigan in Highland Park, Illinois.

=== September ===
- September 1 – Commissioner of Baseball A. Bartlett Giamatti dies of a heart attack. On September 13, club owners elect Fay Vincent as his successor.
- September 2–3 – Fraternity members attending the Greekfest fraternity festival in Virginia Beach, Virginia spend two days rioting and looting.
- September 5 – U.S. President George H. W. Bush holds up a bag of cocaine purchased across the street at Lafayette Park, and proposes to spend $7.9 billion in the war on drugs, in his first televised speech to the nation.
- September 8 – Former president Ronald Reagan undergoes surgery to remove fluid on his brain. He recovers quickly.
- September 14 – Standard Gravure shooting: Factory worker Joseph Wesbecker kills 8 and injures 12 before committing suicide inside a factory in Louisville, Kentucky.
- September 21 – Hurricane Hugo makes landfall in South Carolina, causing $7 billion in damage.
- September 27–28 – President Bush and the governors of the 50 U.S. states meet at the University of Virginia to discuss education policy.
- September 28
  - Braniff Incorporated files for bankruptcy for the second time since 1982.
  - Former Philippines President Ferdinand Marcos dies in an inter-organ failure at his hospital in Honolulu, Hawaii, United States.
- September 29 – In the biggest narcotics seizure on record, drug agents confiscate 21.4 short tons of cocaine and more than $12 million in cash from a Los Angeles warehouse.

=== October ===
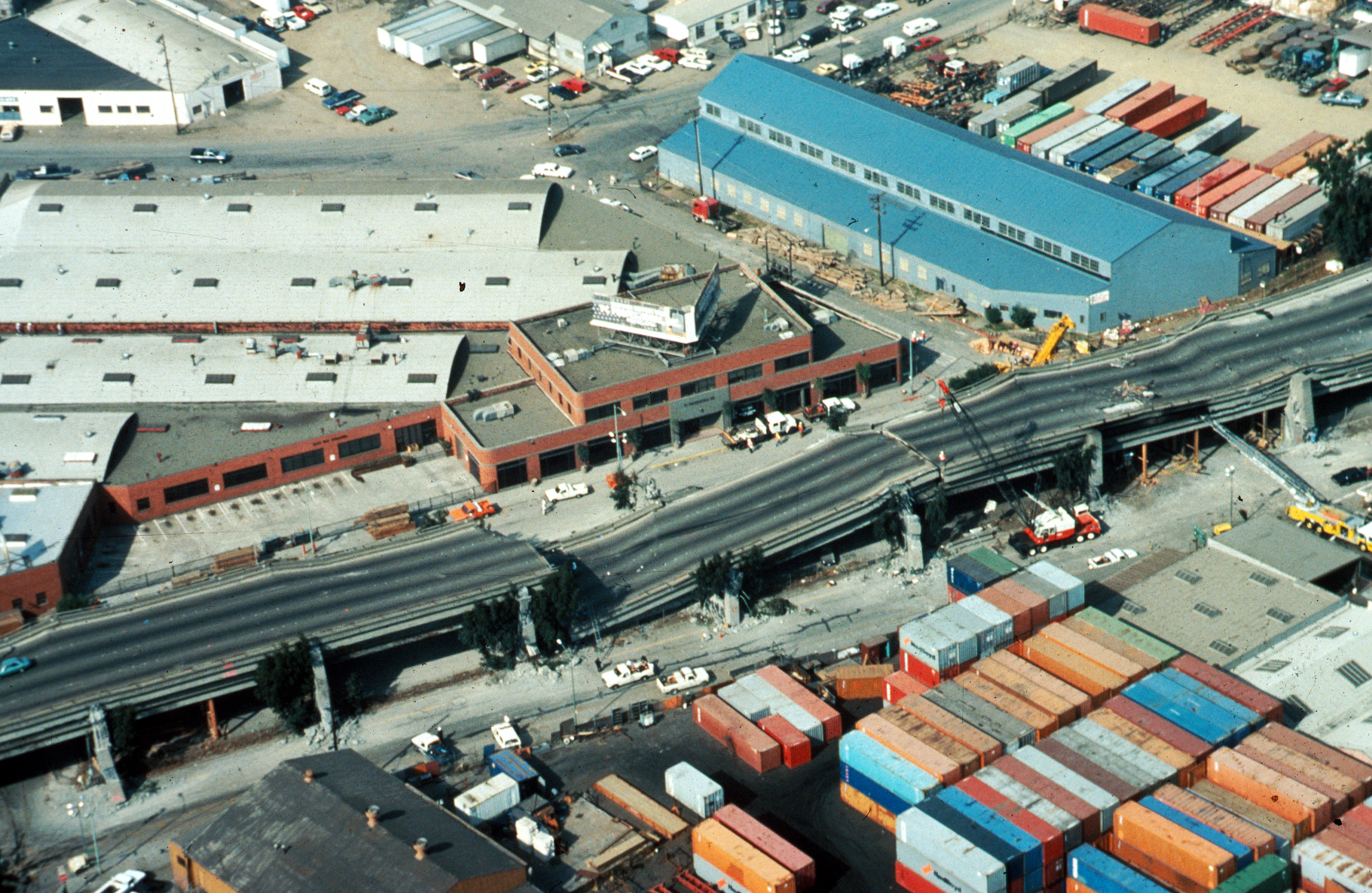
October 17: Loma Prieta earthquake

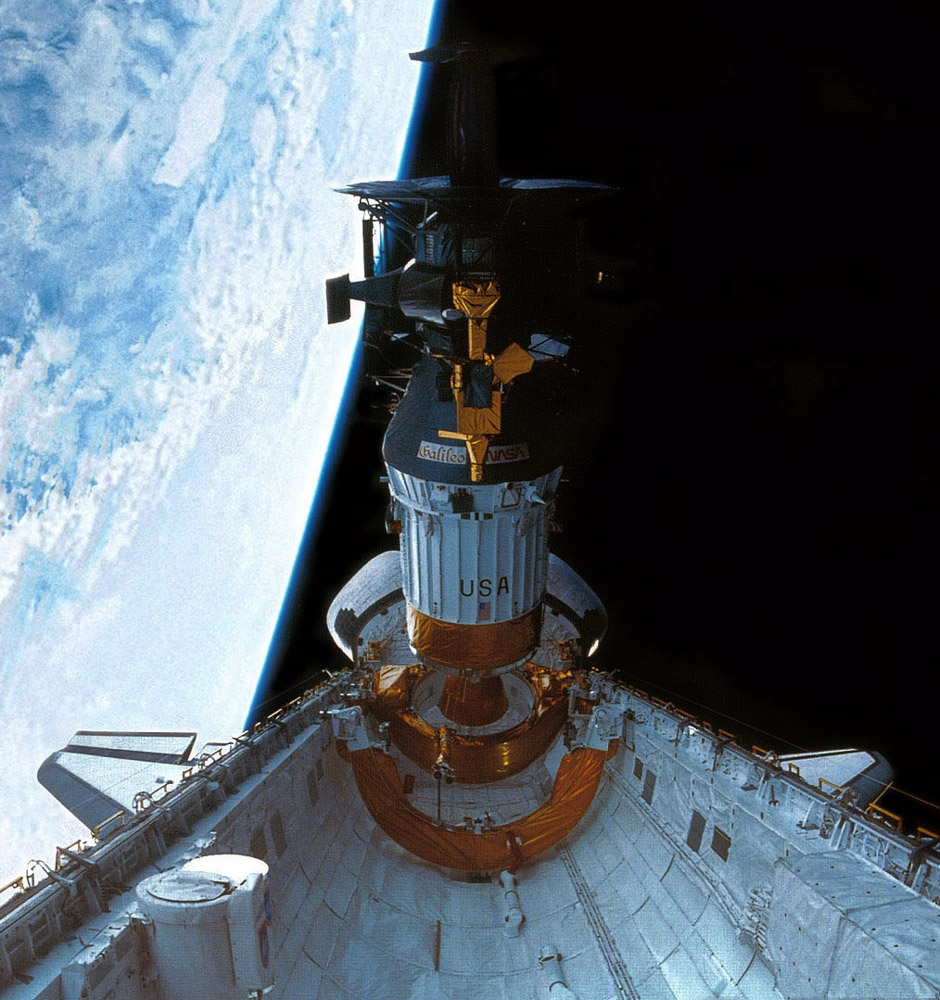
October 18: Galileo and its Inertial Upper Stage (IUS) booster being deployed by the Space Shuttle Atlantis on the STS-34 mission.

- October 4 – More than 55,000 Boeing machinists go on strike. They return to work on November 22 after winning higher pay.
- October 5 – A jury in Charlotte, North Carolina convicts televangelist Jim Bakker of fraud and conspiracy. On October 24, he is sentenced to 45 years in prison and fined $500,000.
- October 9 – The Dow Jones Industrial Average closes at a record high of 2,791.41.
- October 12
  - The Dallas Cowboys and the Minnesota Vikings complete the Herschel Walker trade.
  - Congress passes the Flag Protection Act of 1989, which Bush allows to become law without his signature on October 28.
- October 13 – Friday the 13th mini-crash: The Dow Jones Industrial Average plunges 190.58 points, or 6.91 percent, to close at 2,569.26, most likely after the junk bond market collapses.
- October 15 – Wayne Gretzky becomes the leading scorer in the history of the National Hockey League.
- October 17 – The 6.9 M_{w} Loma Prieta earthquake shakes the San Francisco Bay Area and the Central Coast with a maximum Mercalli intensity of IX (Violent). Sixty-three people were killed and damage amounted to $5.6–6 billion.
- October 18 – STS-34 is launched, deploying the Jupiter-bound Galileo probe.
- October 19 – The Wonders of Life pavilion opens at Epcot in Walt Disney World, Florida.
- October 20
  - The Senate convicts Judge Alcee Hastings of the United States District Court for the Southern District of Florida of perjury and conspiracy to obtain a bribe, and removes him from office.
  - A federal jury in New York City convicts Rep. Robert García of extortion and conspiracy.
- October 23
  - The Phillips Disaster in Pasadena, Texas kills 23 and injures 314 others.
  - STS-34 lands at Edwards Air Force Base in California after five days of its mission and the successful deployment of a Jupiter-bound spacecraft.
  - Congress fails to override Bush's veto of a bill that would have restored funding for abortions for poor women who were the victims of rape or incest.
- October 26 – NFL owners elect Paul Tagliabue as NFL commissioner.
- October 28 – The Oakland Athletics beat the San Francisco Giants to win the 1989 World Series.

=== November ===
- November 2 – North Dakota and South Dakota celebrate their 100th birthdays.
- November 3 – The Senate convicts Judge Walter Nixon of the United States District Court for the Southern District of Mississippi of lying under oath to a federal grand jury and removes him from office.
- November 7
  - Douglas Wilder wins the Virginia governor's race, becoming the first elected African American governor in the United States.
  - David Dinkins becomes the first African American mayor of New York City.
- November 8 – Congress passes legislation to raise the minimum wage from $3.35 to $4.25 an hour by April 1991. Bush signs this bill on November 17.
- November 9 – The Berlin Wall is brought down.
- November 15 – Lech Wałęsa, leader of Poland's Solidarity movement, addresses a Joint session of the United States Congress.
- November 15–16 – November 1989 tornado outbreak: Tornadoes in the Eastern United States kill at least 31 people.
- November 16
  - Six Jesuit priests—among them Ignacio Ellacuría, Segundo Montes, and Ignacio Martín-Baró—their housekeeper, and her teenage daughter, are murdered by U.S. trained Salvadoran soldiers.
  - The House of Representatives passes amendments to strengthen the Ethics in Government Act of 1978; the Senate passes its own amendments the next day.
- November 17 – Walt Disney Feature Animation's 28th feature film, The Little Mermaid, is released to critical acclaim and is one of Disney's biggest financial successes at the time. After the success of 1986's The Great Mouse Detective and the 1988 Disney/Amblin live-action/animated film Who Framed Roger Rabbit, the film is given credit for breathing life back into the art of Disney animated feature films after some prior films produced by Disney were struggling. It also marks the start of the era known as the Disney Renaissance.
- November 19 – United States Soccer Team qualified to the 1990 FIFA World Cup after 40 years of absences, beating Trinidad & Tobago 1–0 in Port Spain, The goal scored by Paul Caligiuri was named as:Shot heard round the world
- November 21 – North Carolina celebrates its bicentennial statehood.
- November 22
  - Congress repeals the Medicare Catastrophic Coverage Act of 1988.
  - The Space Shuttle Discovery begins STS-33.

=== December ===
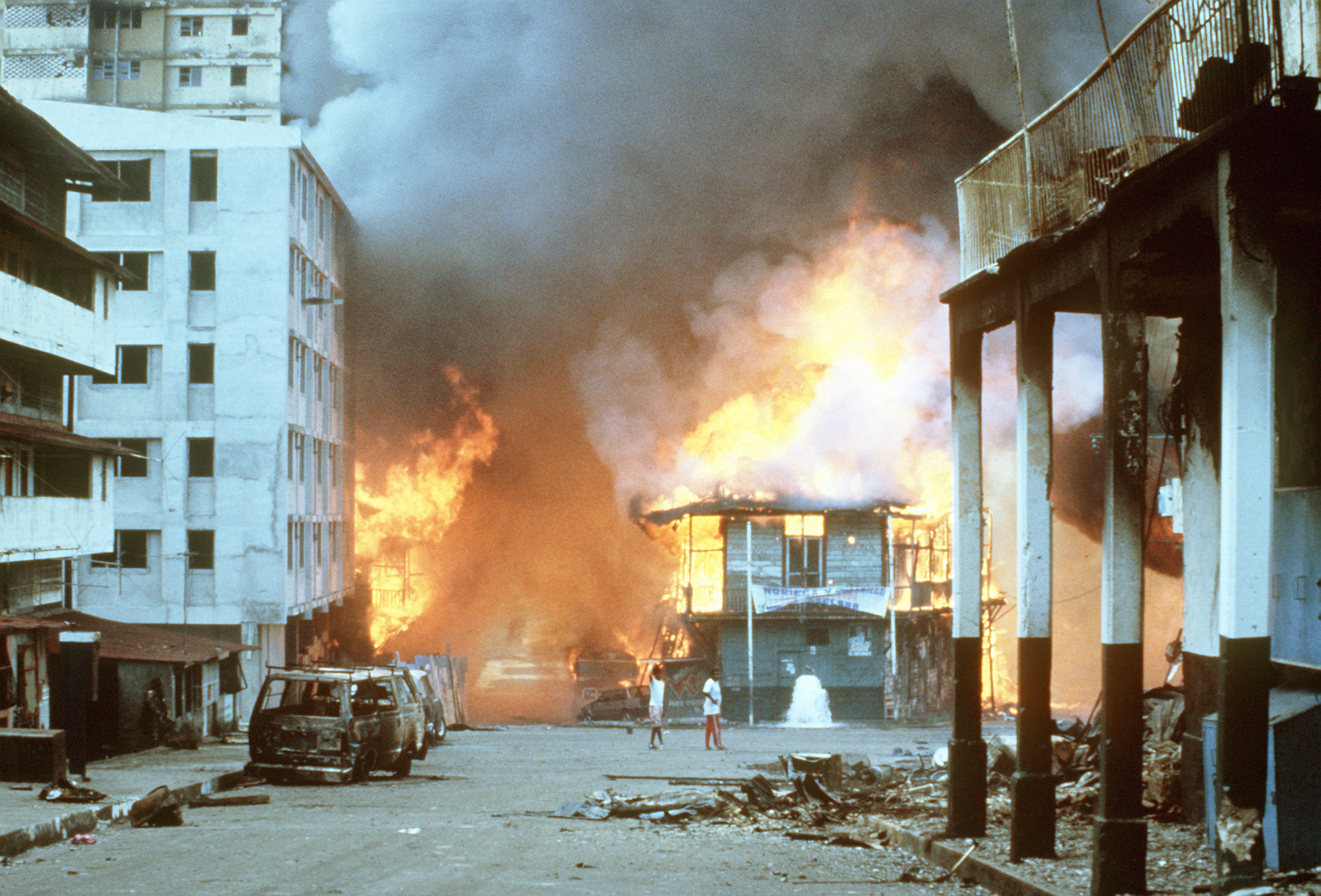
December 20: United States invasion of Panama

- December 2 – The Solar Maximum Mission research satellite, launched in 1980, crashes back to earth.
- December 3 – Cold War: In a meeting off the coast of Malta, U.S. President George H. W. Bush and Soviet leader Mikhail Gorbachev release statements indicating that the Cold War between their nations may be coming to an end.
- December 7 – A Miami, Florida jury convicts police officer William Lozano for the January 16 deaths of a black motorcyclist and his passenger.
- December 10 – Members of ACT UP organize Stop the Church, a demonstration in Manhattan protesting Cardinal John O’Connor. Over one hundred protestors are arrested.
- December 12 – Hotelier Leona Helmsley is sentenced to four years in prison and fined $7.2 million for tax evasion.
- December 16–18 – Mail bombings kill a federal judge in Birmingham, Alabama and a lawyer in Savannah, Georgia.
- December 17 – The television show The Simpsons premiered on FOX with the episode "Simpsons Roasting on an Open Fire".
- December 20 – Operation Just Cause is launched in an attempt to overthrow Panamanian dictator Manuel Noriega.

=== Ongoing ===
- Cold War (1947–1991)

== Births ==
=== January ===
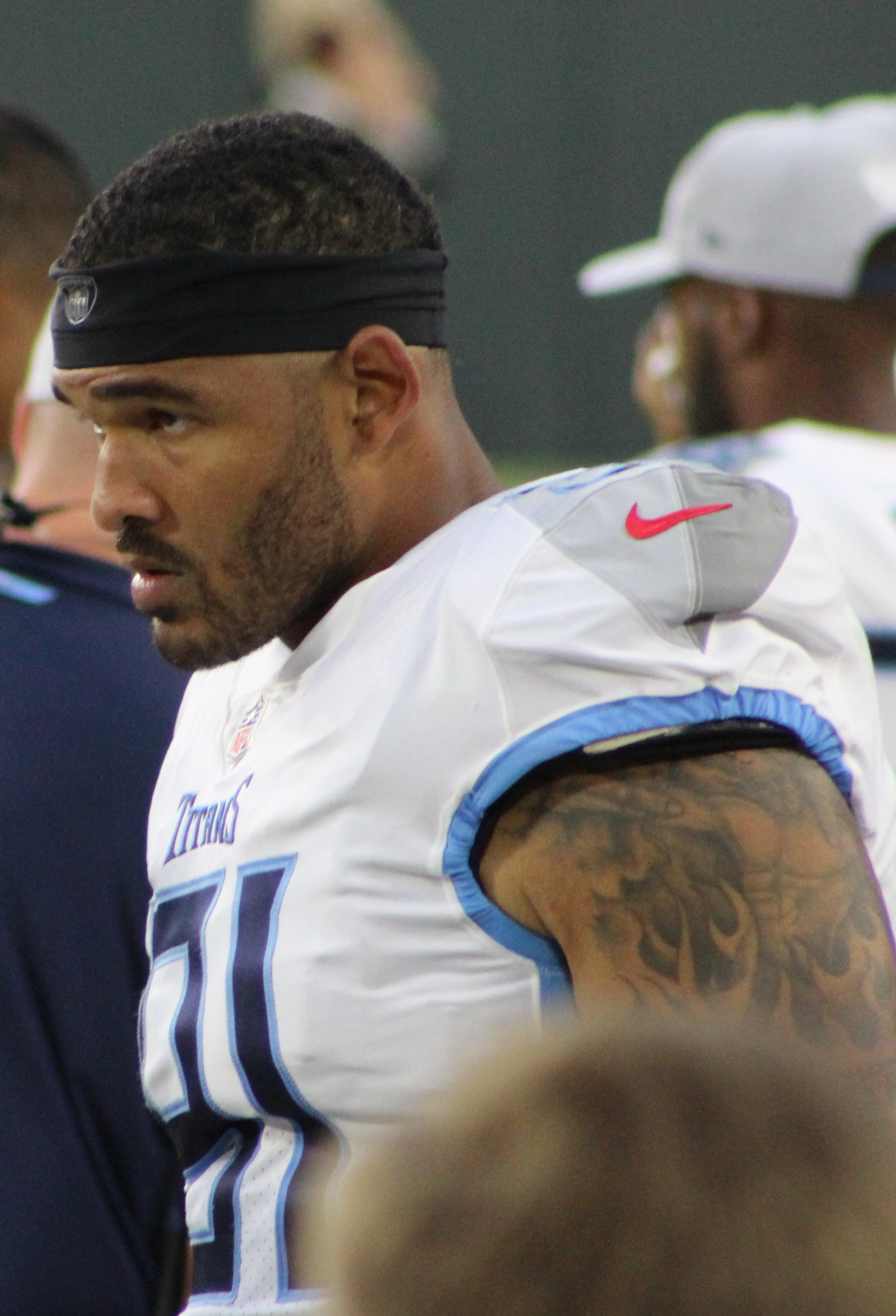
Derrick Morgan

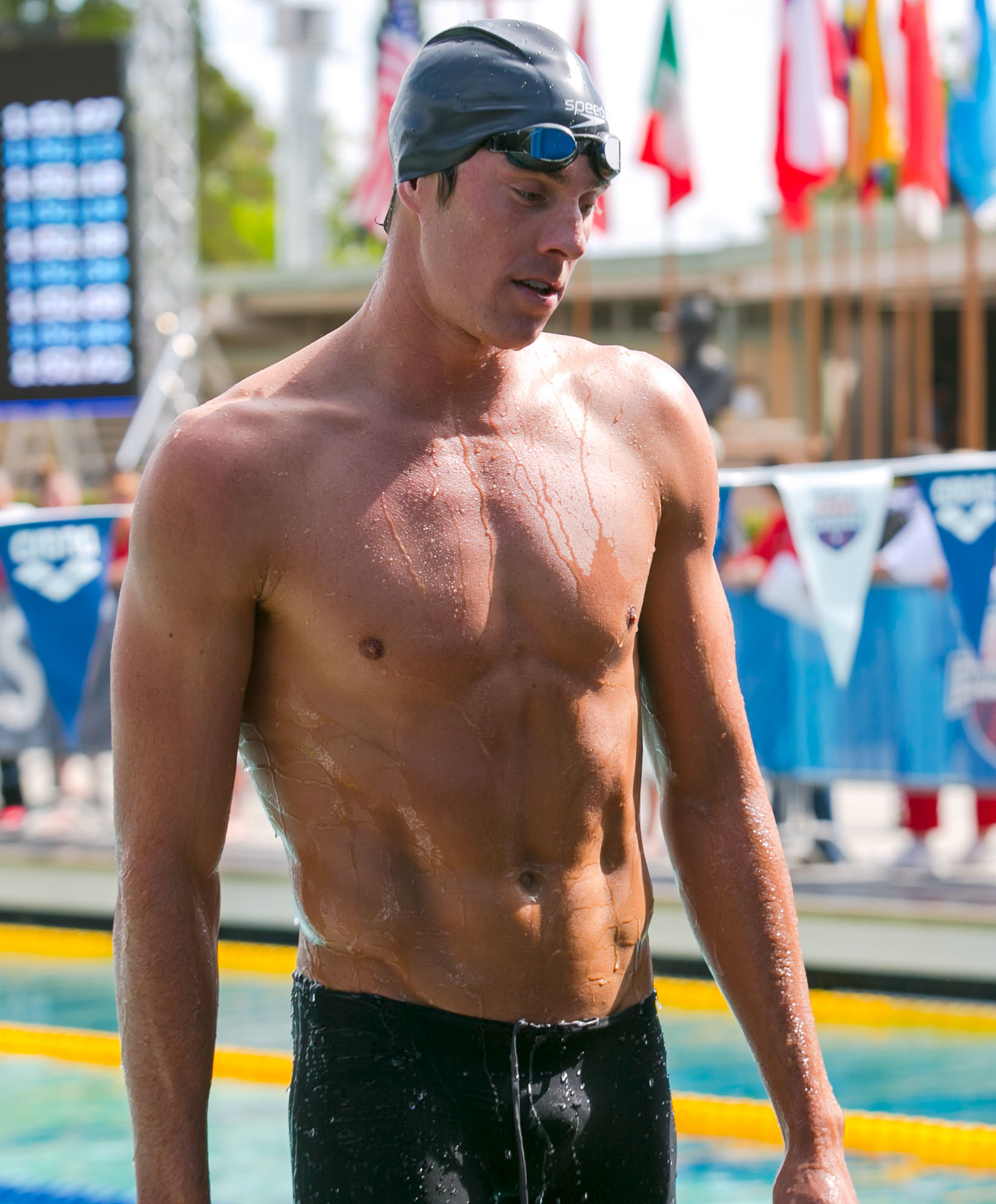
Conor Dwyer

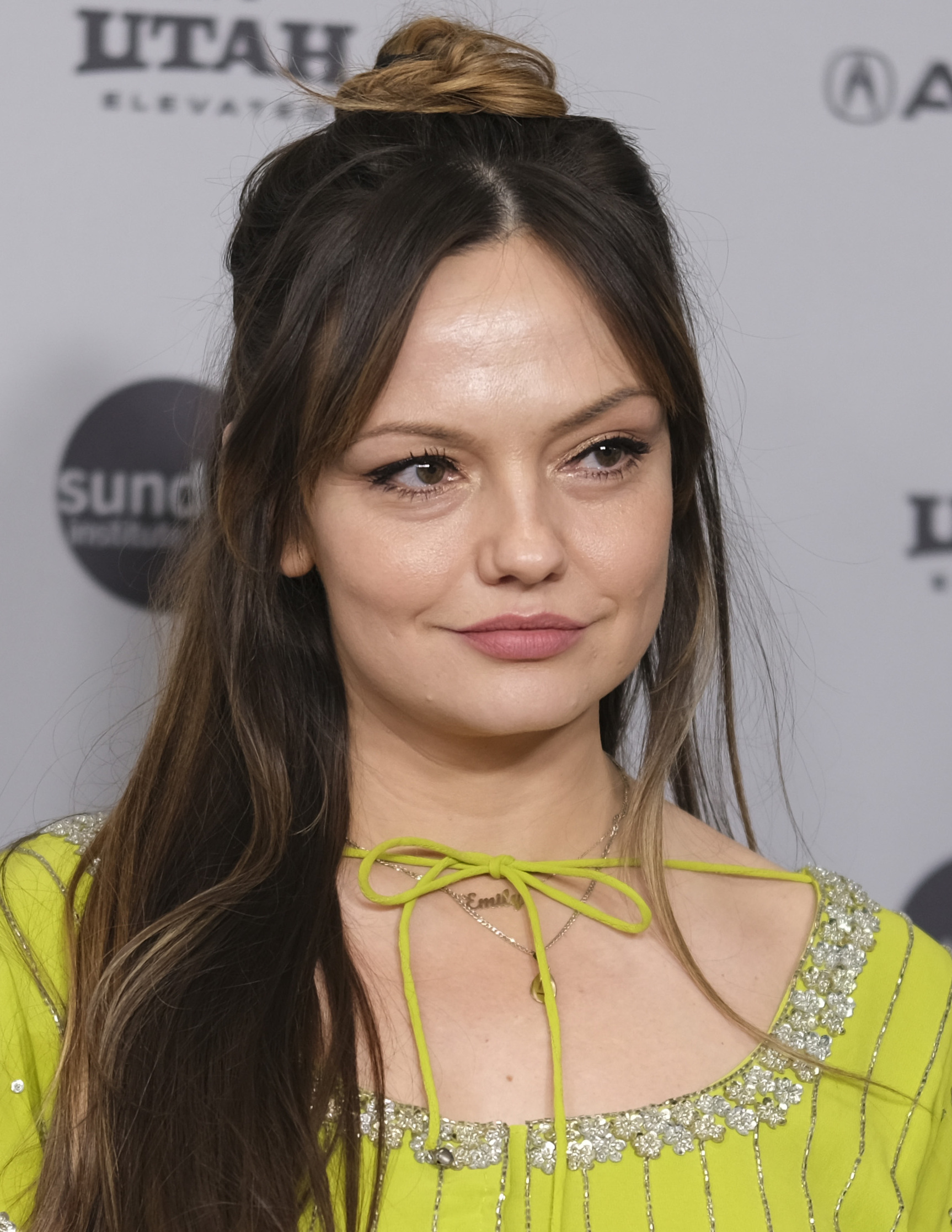
Emily Meade

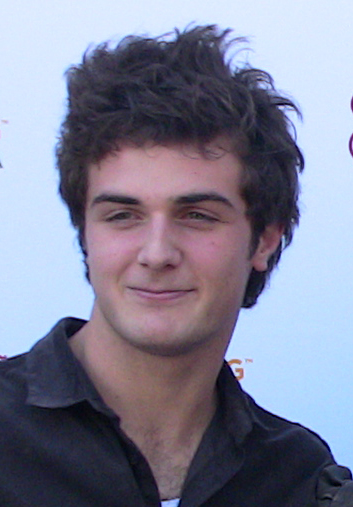
Beau Mirchoff

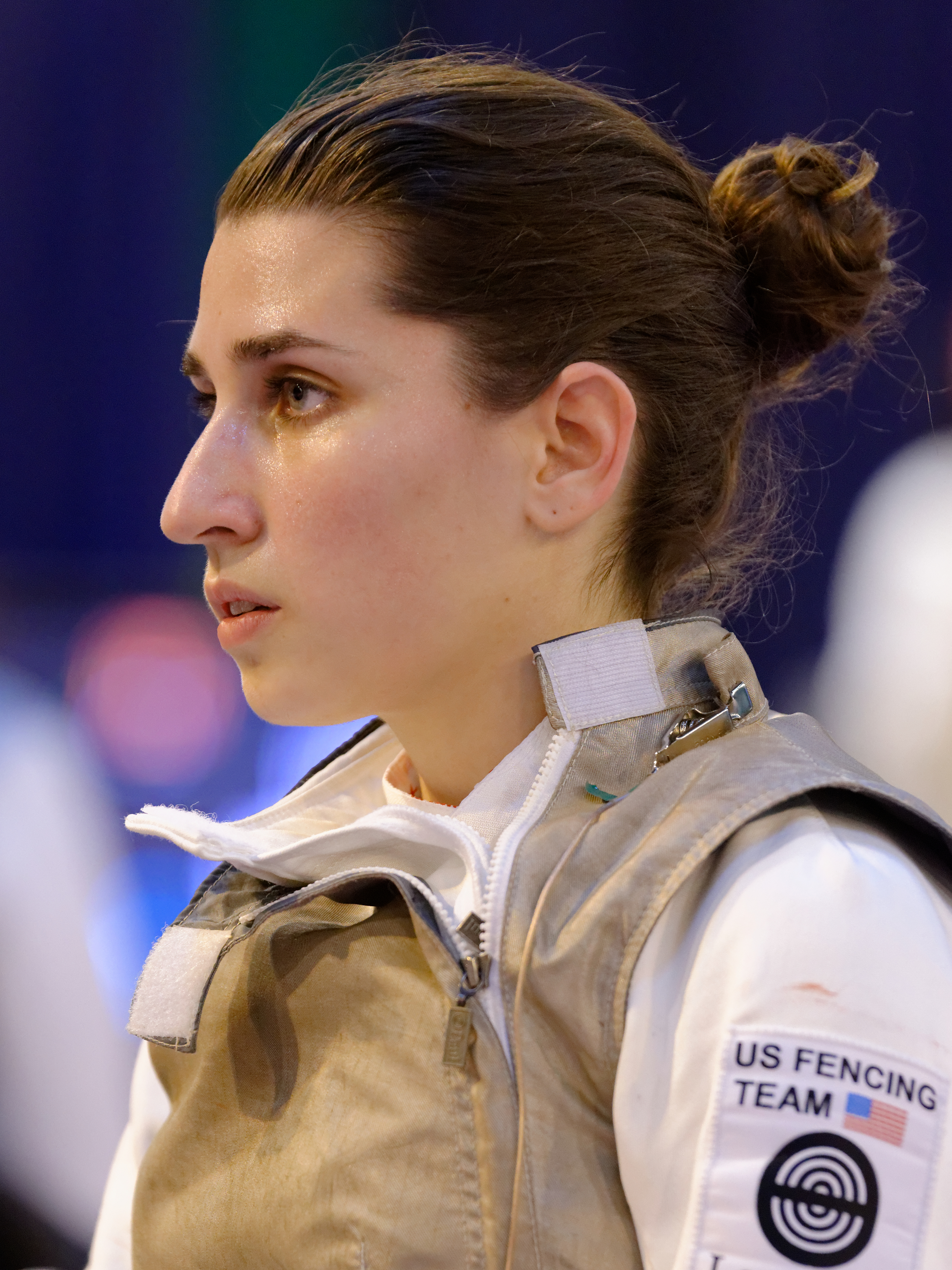
Nicole Ross

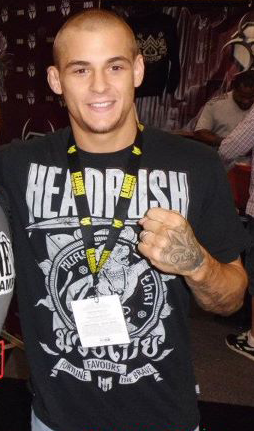
Dustin Poirier

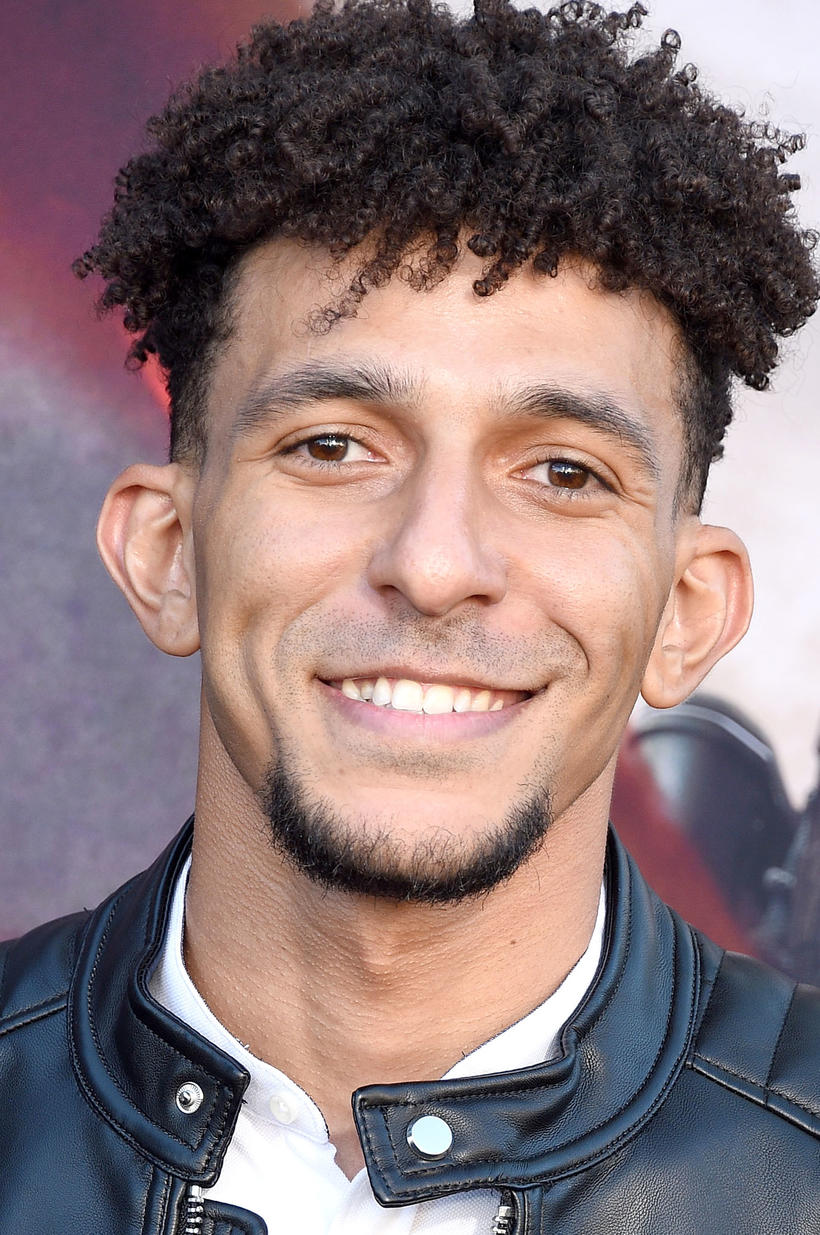
Khleo Thomas

- January 1 – Marvin Austin, football player
- January 3
  - Christian Ballard, football player
  - Bryan Burke, soccer player
  - Alex D. Linz, actor
  - Seth Rich, employee for the DNC (d. 2016)
- January 4
  - Joe Barksdale, singer/songwriter and football player
  - Sessilee Lopez, model
  - Kevin Pillar, baseball player
  - Graham Rahal, race car driver
- January 6
  - James Durbin, singer
  - Derrick Morgan, football player
- January 8
  - Jessica Beard, sprinter
  - Steven Christopher Parker, actor
- January 9 – Michael Beasley, basketball player
- January 10
  - Conor Dwyer, Olympic swimmer
  - Emily Meade, actress
- January 12 – Tiler Peck, ballerina
- January 13
  - Andy Allo, Cameroonian-born singer/songwriter, guitarist, and actress
  - Bryan Arguez, football player
  - James Bird, Welsh-born rugby player
  - Morgan Burnett, football player
  - Doug Martin, football player (d. 2025)
  - Beau Mirchoff, American-born Canadian actor
- January 15
  - Kaveh Akbar, Iranian-born poet and scholar
  - Kelci Bryant, Olympic diver
  - Keiffer Hubbell, ice dancer
  - Tasha Reign, pornographic actress, nude model, stripper, producer, and sex columnist
  - Nicole Ross, Olympic foil fencer
- January 16
  - Charlie Buckingham, Olympic sailor
  - Yvonne Zima, actress
- January 17
  - Byron Bell, football player
  - Blake Beavan, baseball player
  - Kelly Marie Tran, actress
- January 18
  - Rich Balchan, soccer player
  - Steven Bohlemann, Paralympic soccer player
- January 19
  - John Albert, ice hockey player
  - Dustin Poirier, mixed martial artist
- January 21 – Kayla Banwarth, volleyball player and coach
- January 22
  - Brad Bolen, judoka
  - Nick Simmons, actor and singer
- January 23 – James Aiono, football player
- January 24 – Chris Banchero, American-born Filipino basketball player
- January 25
  - Vincent Brown, football player
  - Kevin Burwell, basketball player
  - Kelly Curtis, Olympic skeleton racer
- January 26
  - MarShon Brooks, basketball player
  - Emily Hughes, Olympic figure skater
- January 27
  - Dyllón Burnside, actor and singer
  - Brooke Butler, actor
- January 29
  - Maikon Bonani, football player
  - Troy Brewer, basketball player
- January 30
  - Jahvid Best, football player and Olympic track and field athlete representing St. Lucia
  - Thomas Biesemeyer, Olympic alpine skier
  - Jonathon Blum, ice hockey player
  - Kylie Bunbury, Canadian-born actress
  - Keith Butler, baseball player
  - Khleo Thomas, actor and rapper
- January 31
  - Coady Andrews, soccer player
  - Joanna Atkins, sprinter

=== February ===
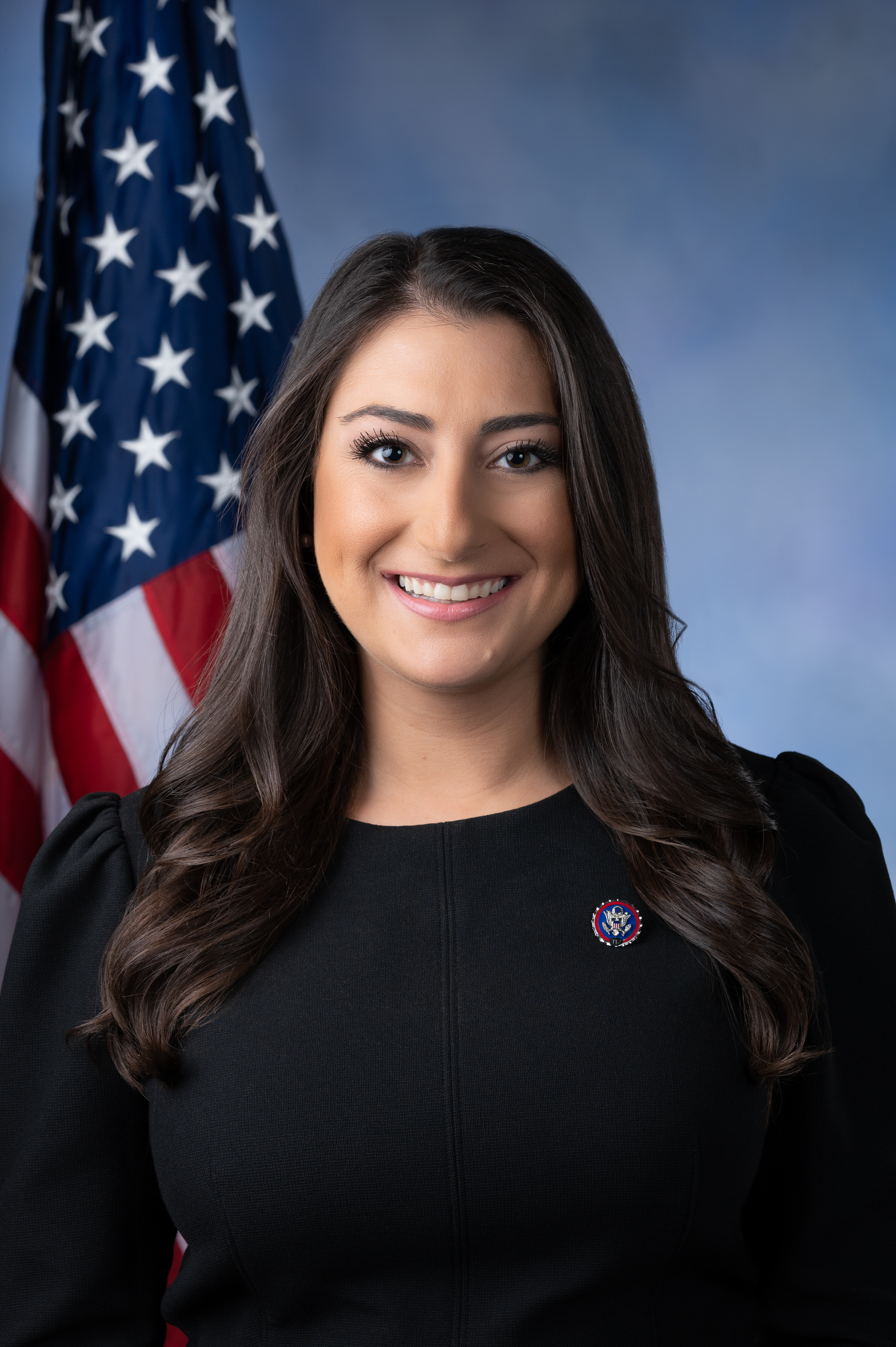
Sara Jacobs

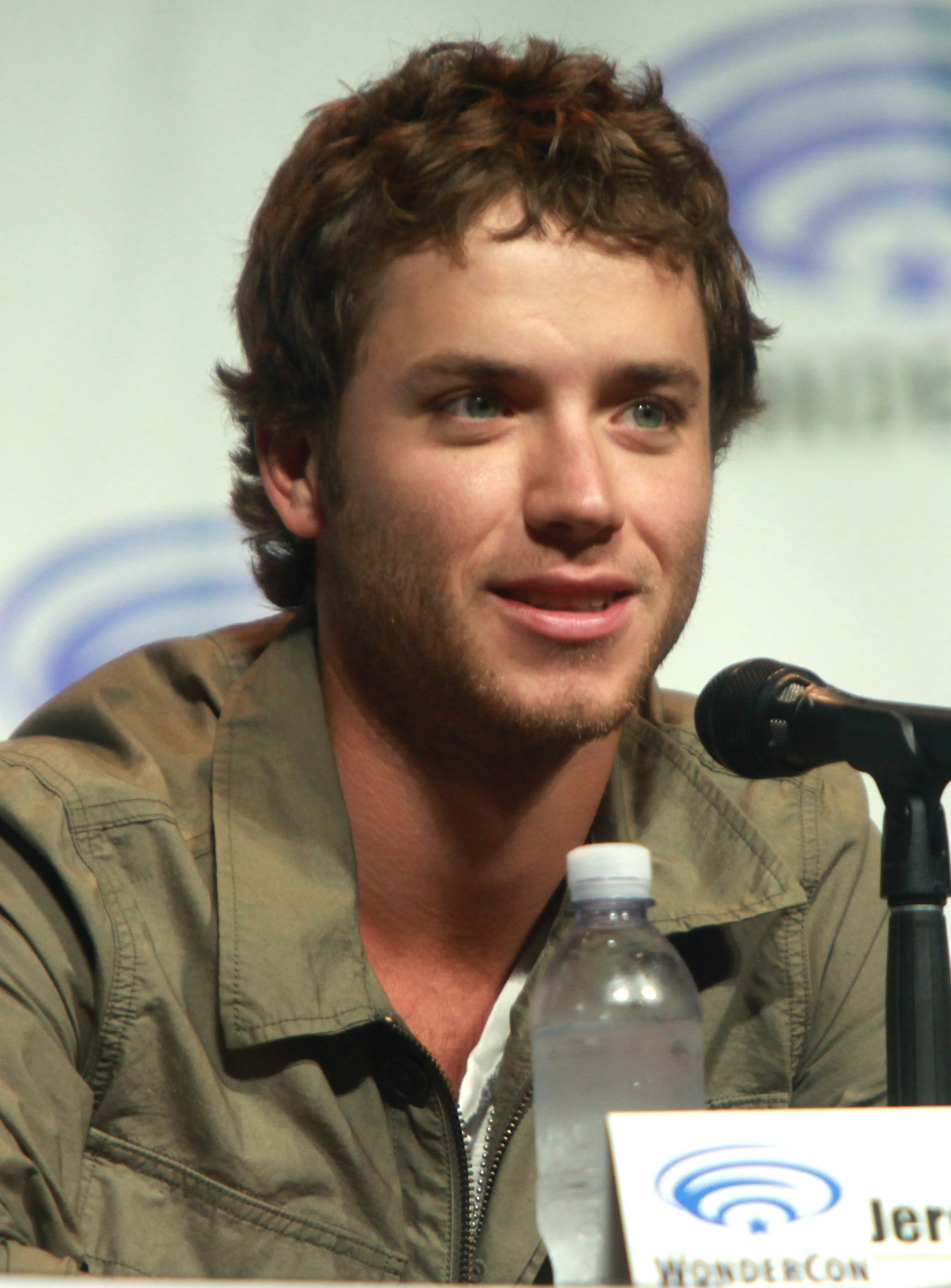
Jeremy Sumpter

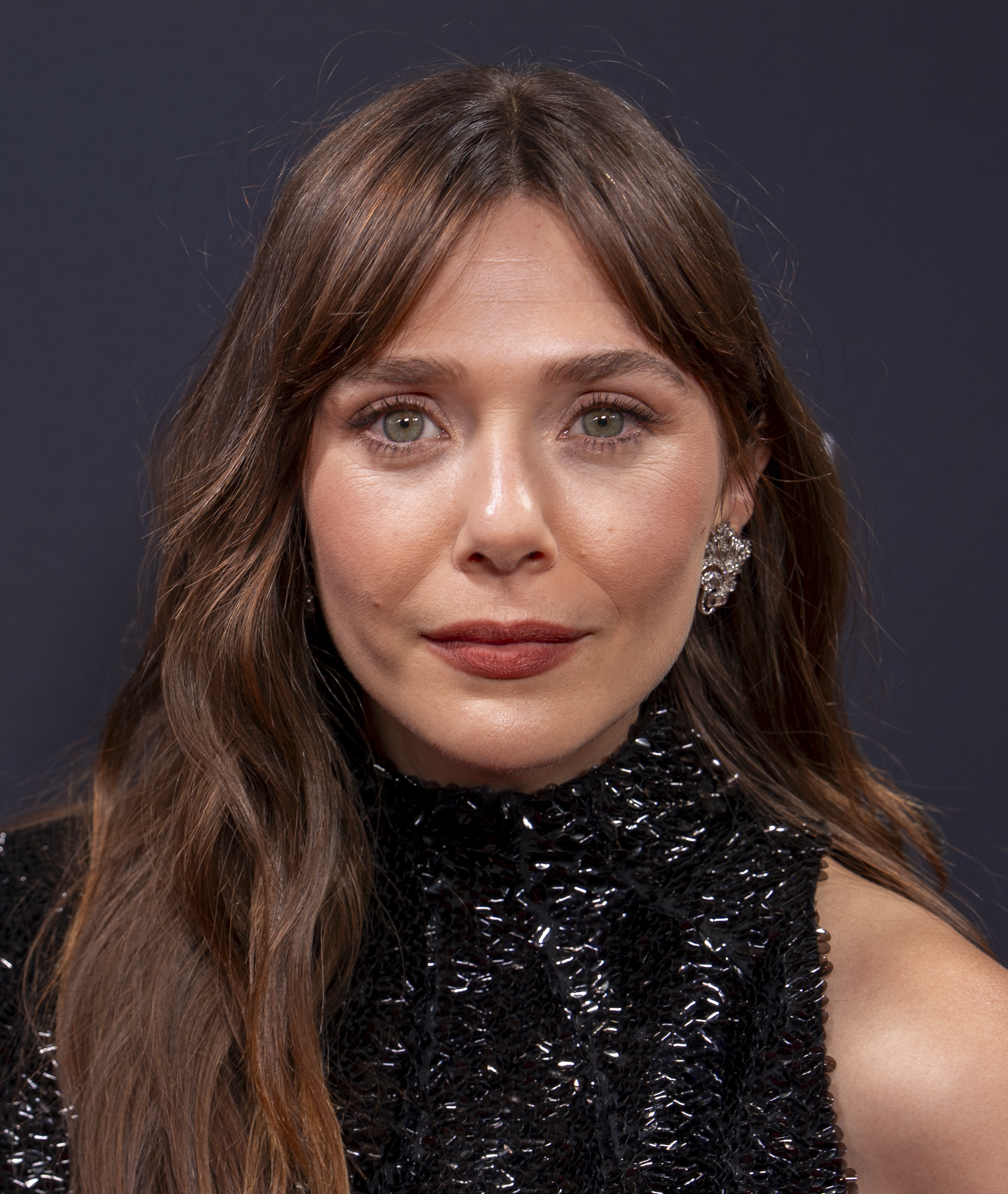
Elizabeth Olsen

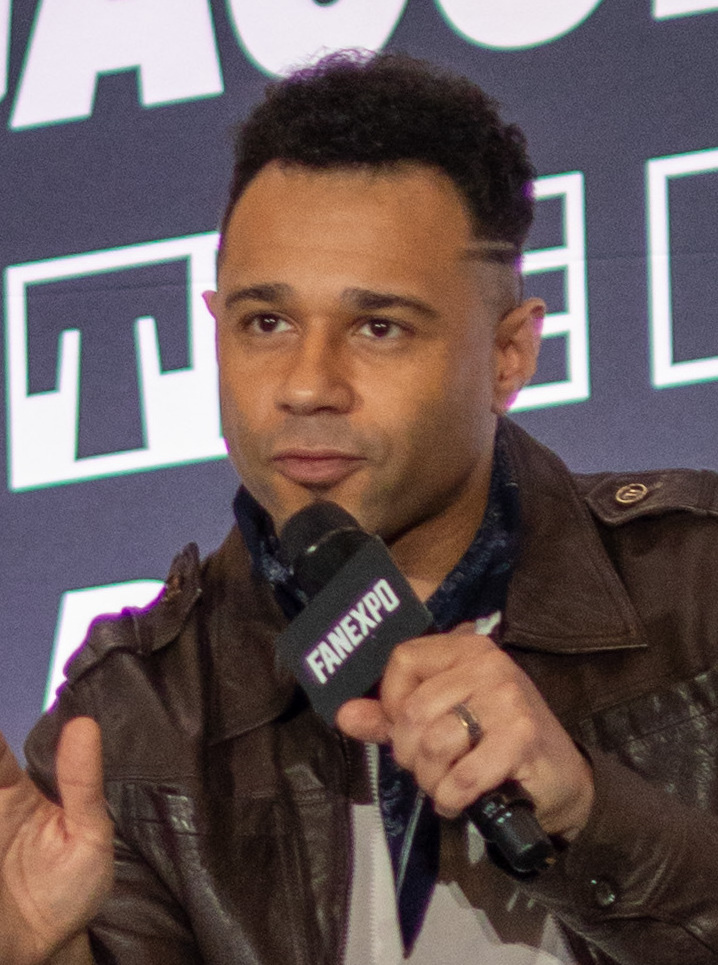
Corbin Bleu

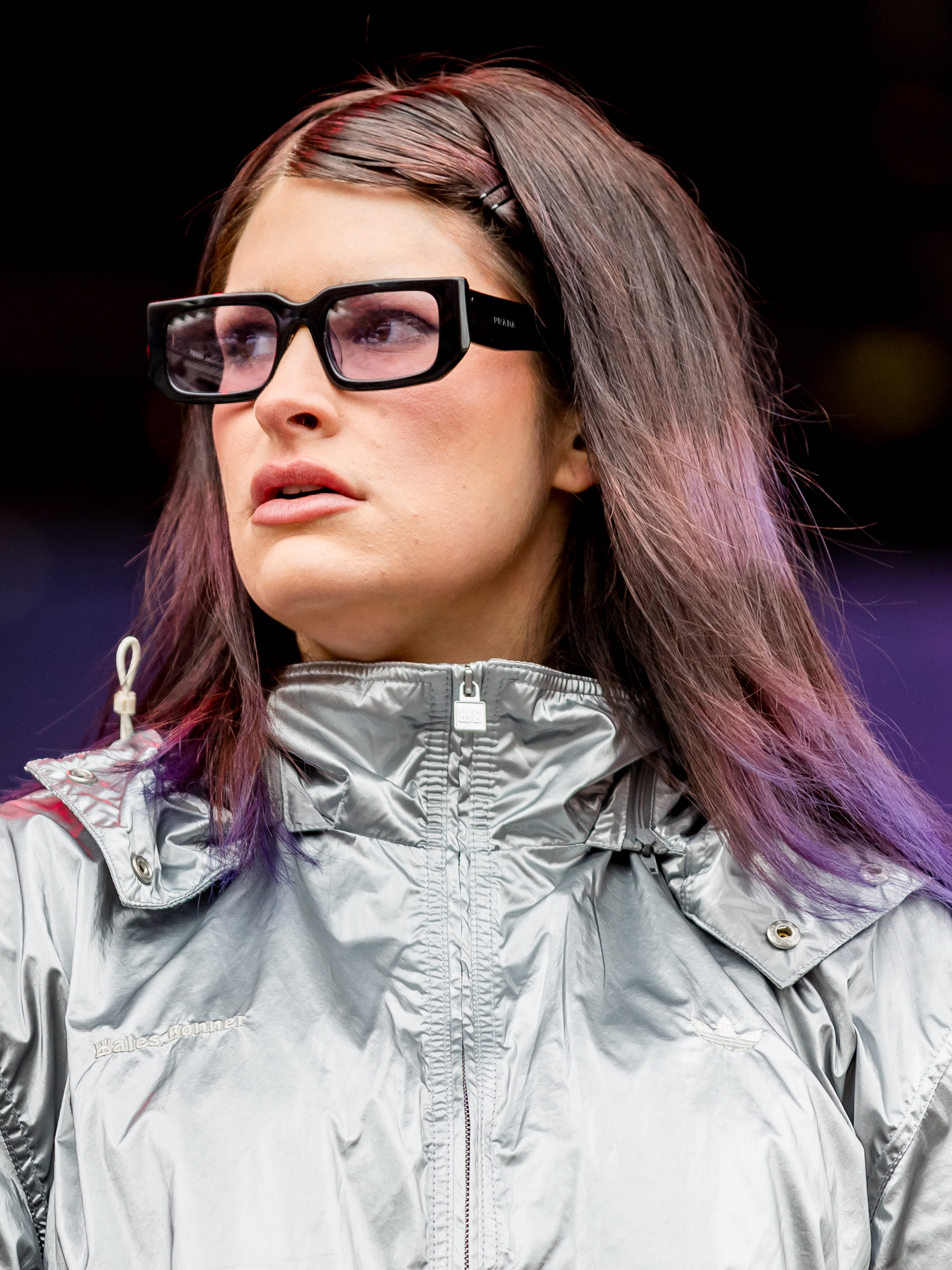
Courtney LaPlante

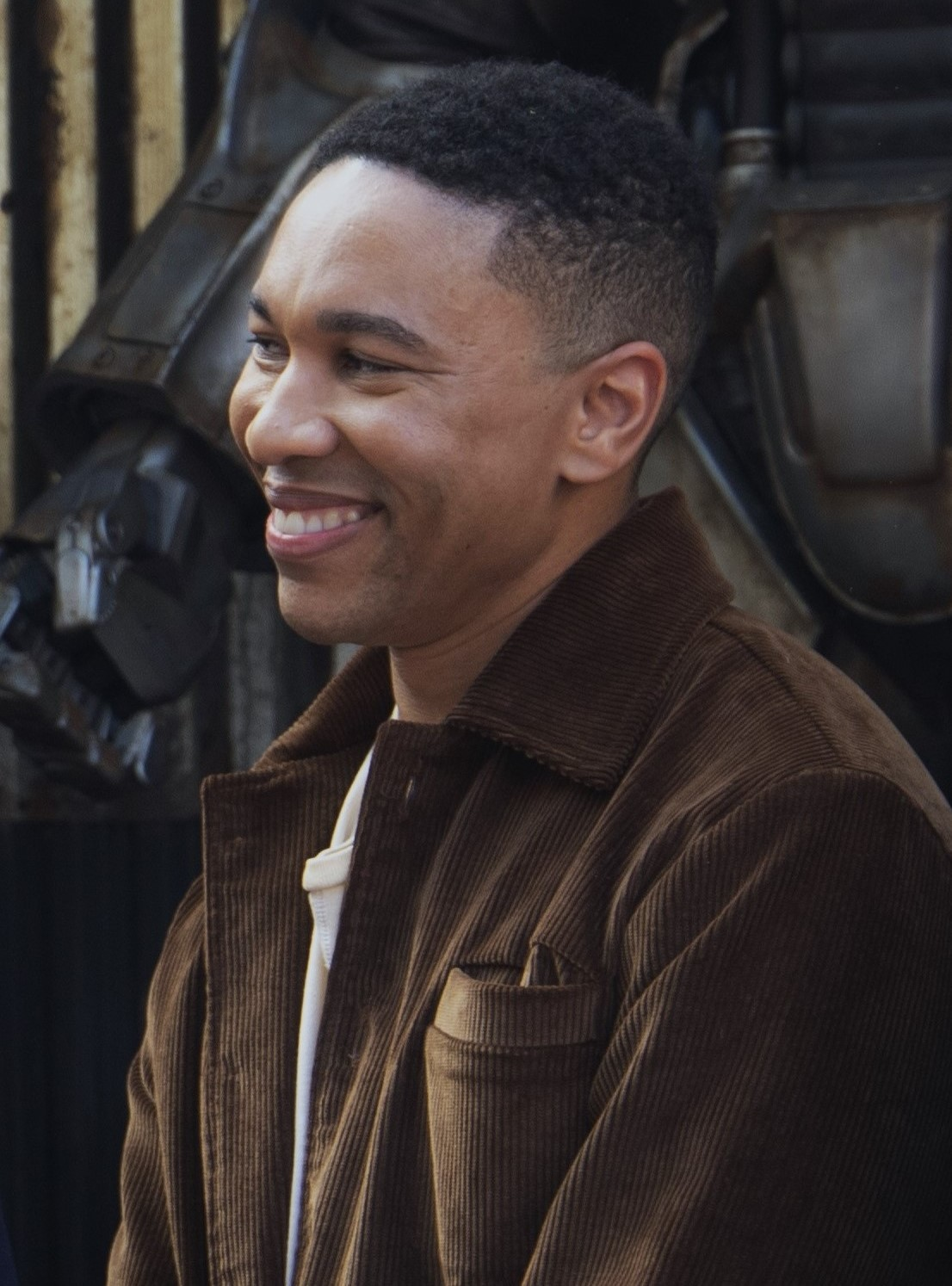
Aaron Moten

- February 1 – Sara Jacobs, politician
- February 2 – Harrison Smith, football player
- February 3 – Ryne Sanborn, hockey player and actor
- February 4
  - Victor Aiyewa, football player
  - Lavoy Allen, basketball player
- February 5
  - Mew2King, esports athlete
  - Jeremy Sumpter, actor
- February 6 – Randall Burden, football player
- February 7
  - Jonathan Kreiss-Tomkins, politician
  - Isaiah Thomas, basketball player
- February 8
  - JaJuan Johnson, basketball player
  - Julio Jones, football player
  - Courtney Vandersloot, basketball player
- February 9 – Mike Brown, football player
- February 10 – Chas Alecxih, football player
- February 11 – Brian Brikowski, football player
- February 13 – Katie Volding, actress
- February 14 – Chazz Anderson, football player
- February 15
  - Matt Balasavage, football player
  - Bonnie Dennison, actress
- February 16 – Elizabeth Olsen, actress
- February 17 – Chord Overstreet, actor and singer
- February 18
  - Whitney Ashley, Olympic discus thrower
  - Carlos Ramirez-Rosa, politician
- February 19
  - Danielle Adams, basketball player
  - Robyn Adele Anderson, singer and actress
  - Matt Hamilton, Olympic curler
- February 20
  - Nate Bussey, football player
  - Jack Falahee, actor
- February 21
  - Jake Bequette, football player and political candidate
  - Corbin Bleu, actor, model, dancer, film producer, and singer/songwriter
  - Kristin Herrera, actress
  - Scout Taylor-Compton, actress
- February 22 – Chris Bassitt, baseball player
- February 23
  - Evan Bates, Olympic ice dancer
  - Chris Conte, football player
- February 24
  - Jacqueline Alemany, journalist and political reporter
  - Brian Bell, wheelchair basketball player
  - Ammar Campa-Najjar, politician
  - Trace Cyrus, musician and guitarist for Metro Station
  - Kosta Koufos, Greek-born basketball player
- February 26 – Courtney LaPlante, American-born Canadian singer and vocalist for Iwrestledabearonce (2012–2015) and Spiritbox (2016–present)
- February 27 – Stefano Langone, singer
- February 28
  - Chad Bell, baseball player
  - Aaron Moten, actor

=== March ===
Daniella Monet

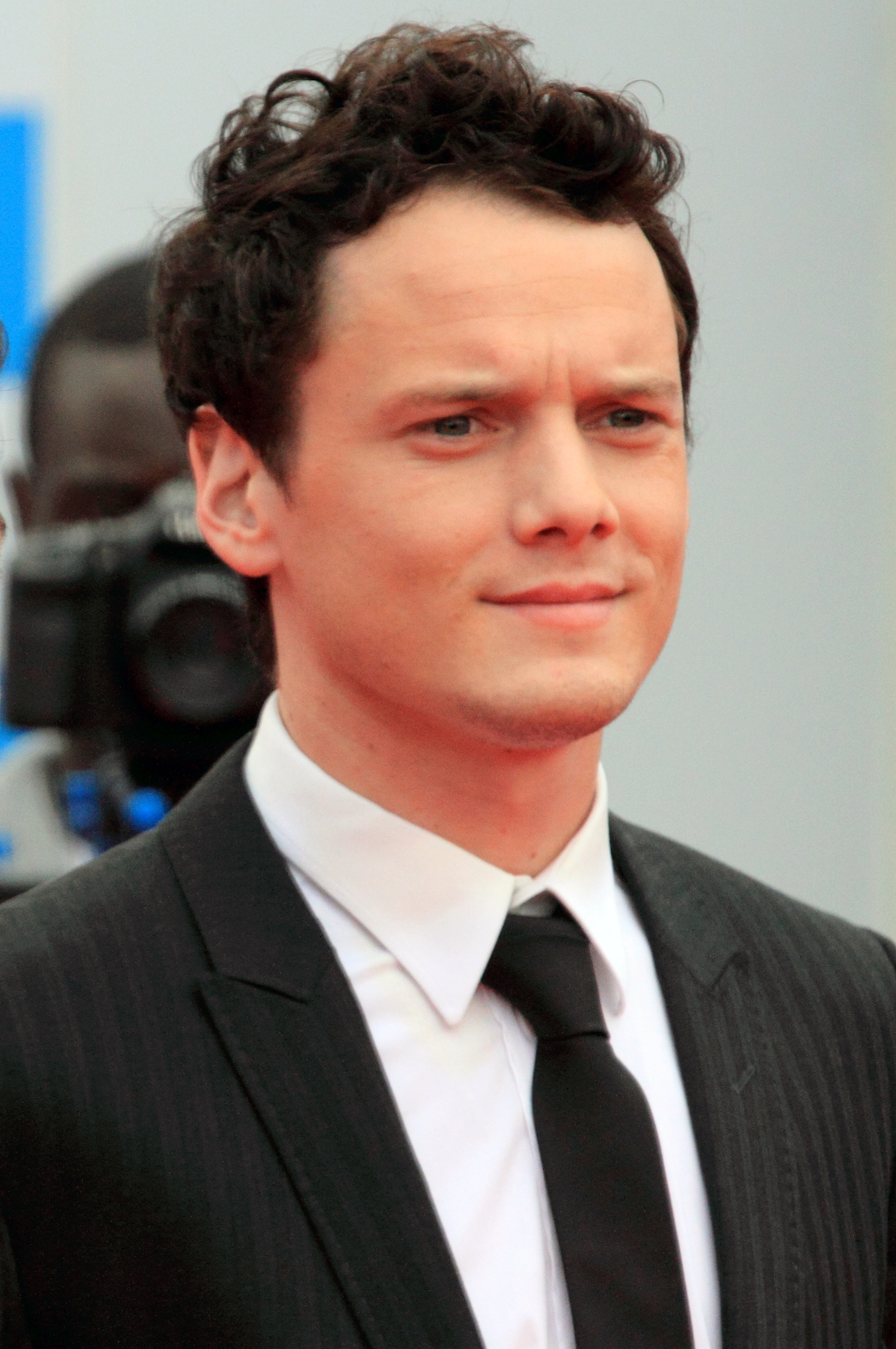
Anton Yelchin

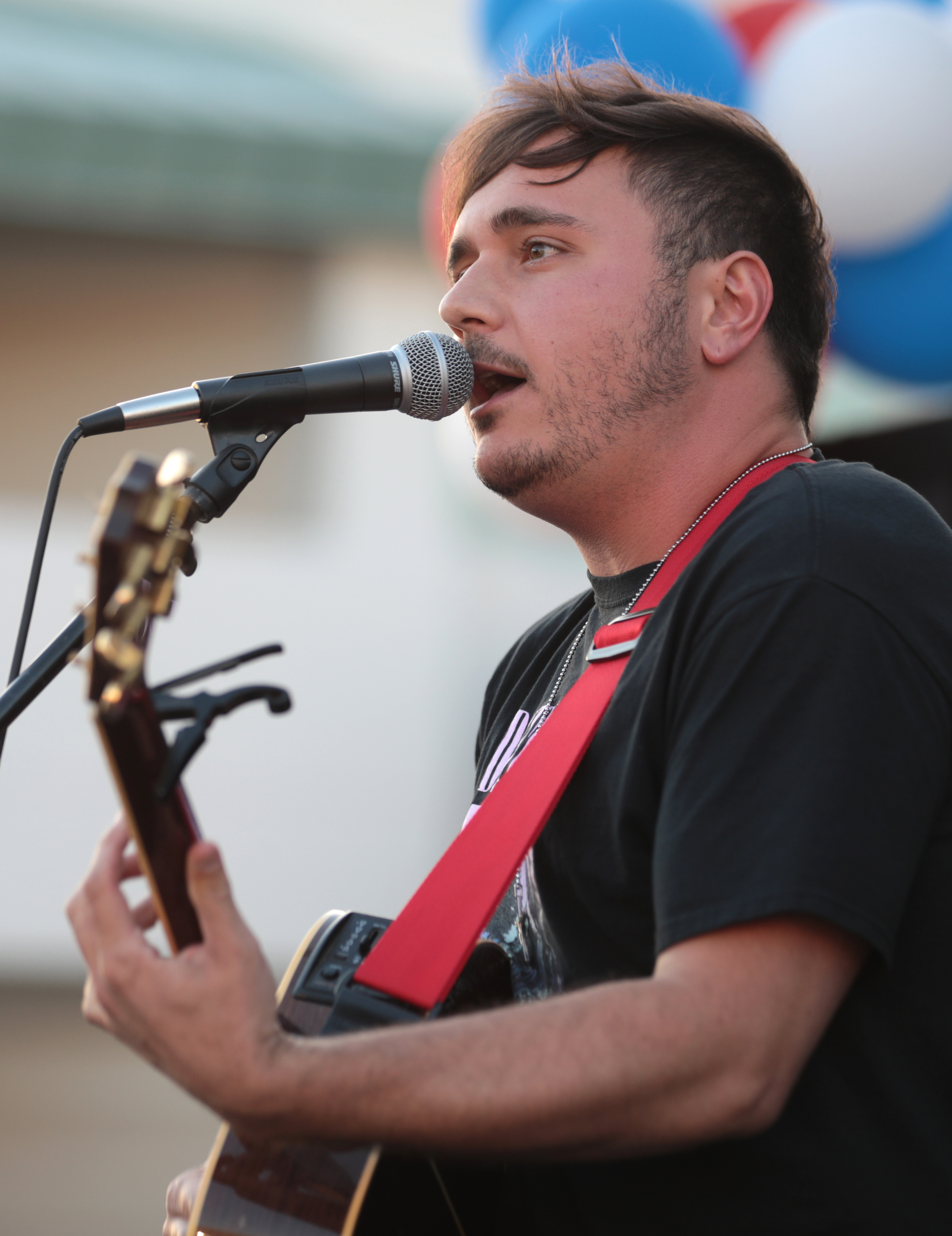
Mason Musso

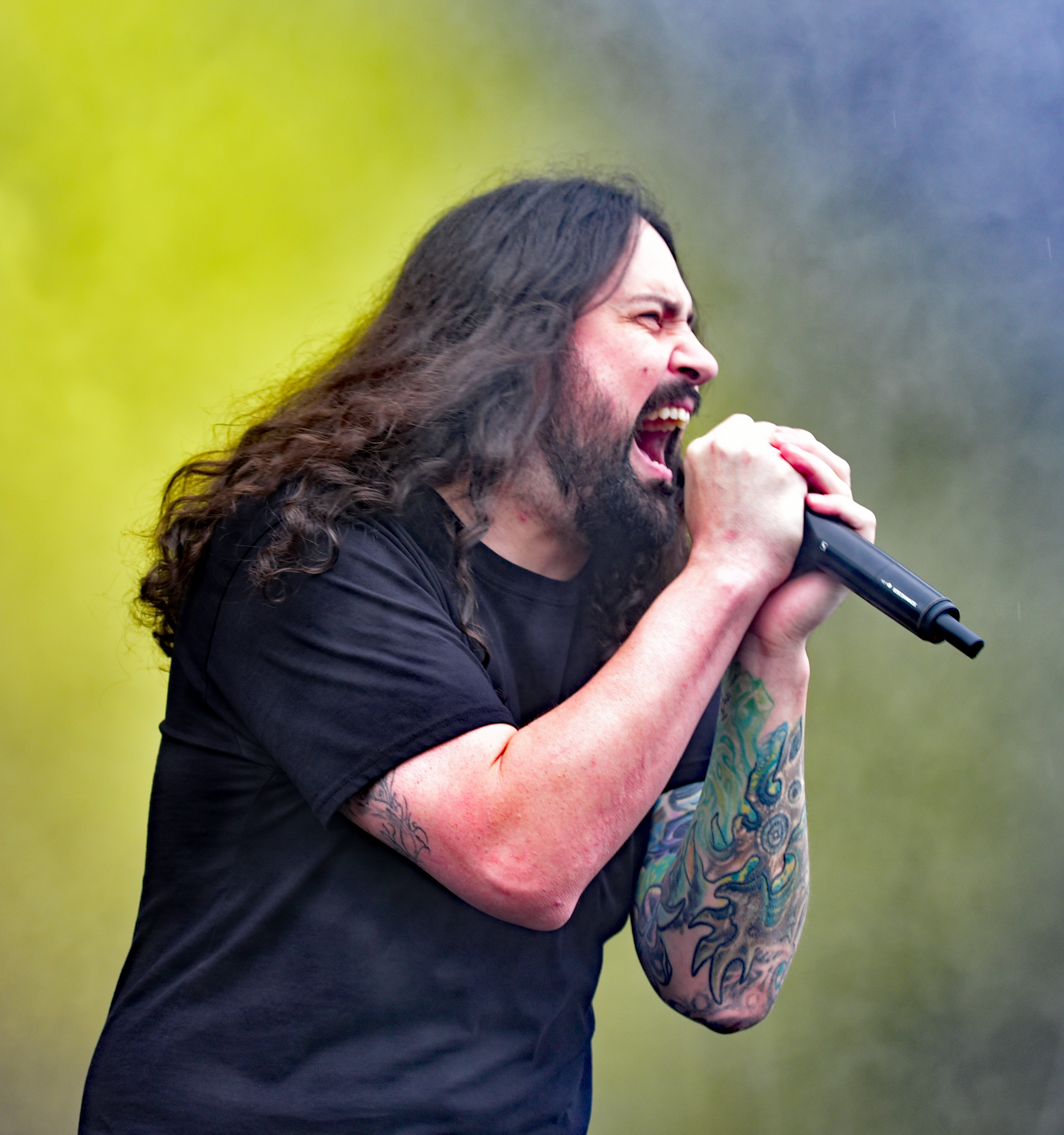
Ronnie Canizaro

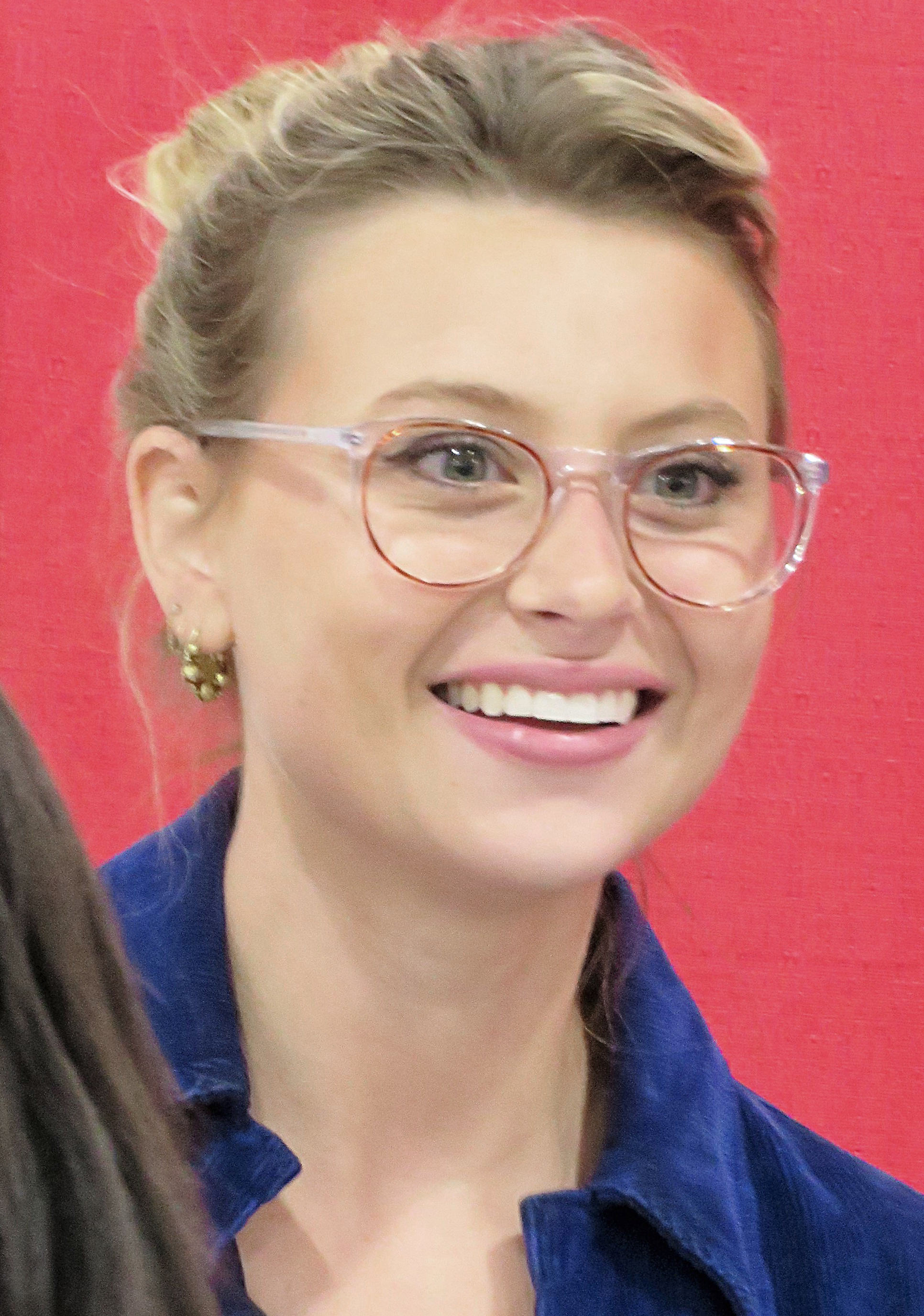
Aly Michalka

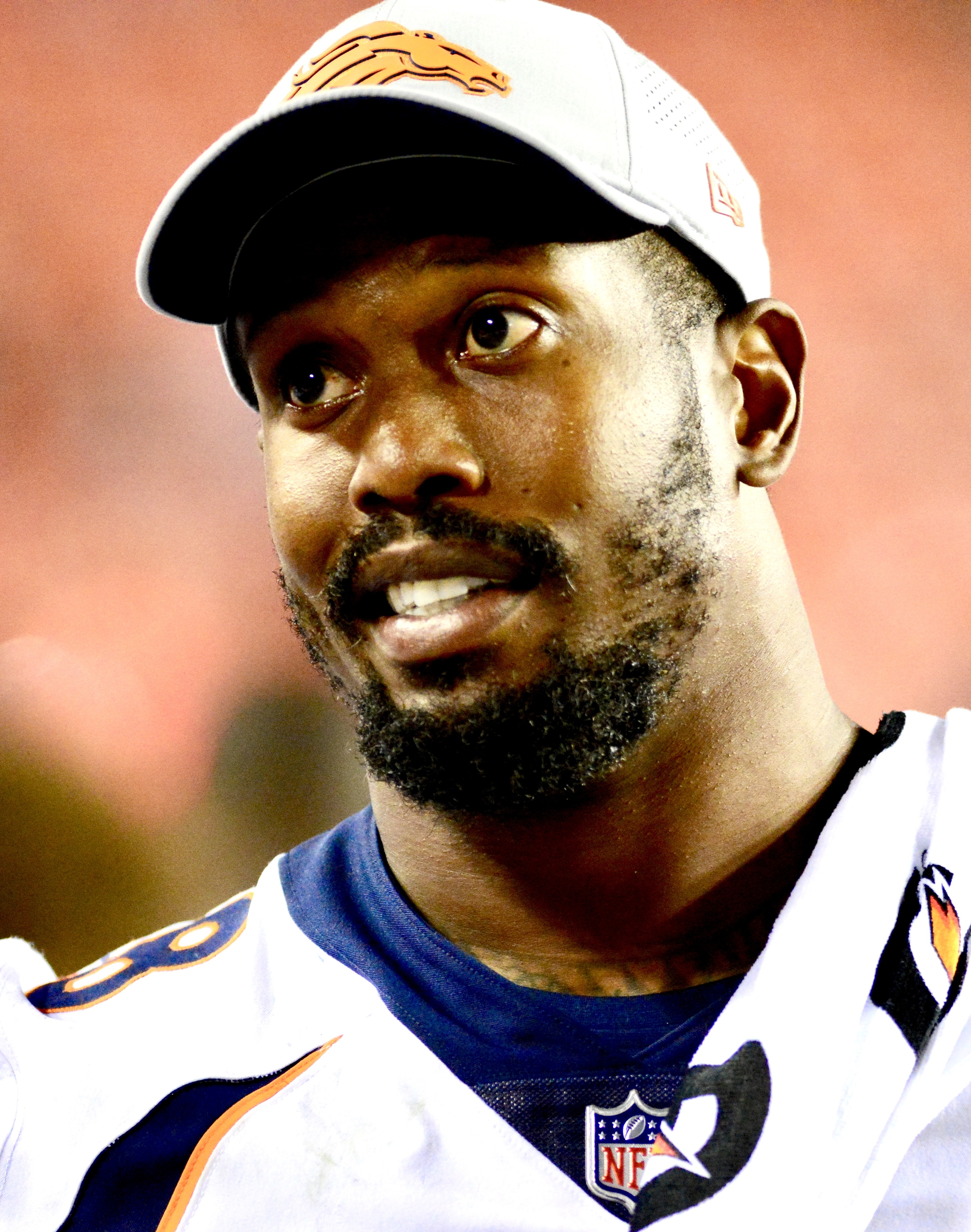
Von Miller

- March 1
  - Sonya Kitchell, singer/songwriter
  - Daniella Monet, actress and singer
- March 3
  - Val Astaire, pop singer/songwriter
  - Seth Blair, baseball player
  - Marcus Boyd, sprinter
  - John Brantley, football player
  - D. J. Bryant, football player
- March 4 – Erin Heatherton, fashion model
- March 5
  - Jake Lloyd, actor
  - Sterling Knight, actor
- March 6
  - Colin Briggs, lacrosse player
  - Stephanie Brombacher, softball player
  - Josh Bush, football player
  - Dwight Buycks, basketball player
  - Tabitha Peterson, Olympic curler
- March 7 – Gerald Anderson, Filipino-born actor
- March 8 – Drayson Bowman, ice hockey player
- March 10 – Nina Jankowicz, researcher and author, head of the U.S. Disinformation Governance Board
- March 11 – Anton Yelchin, Russian-born Actor (d. 2016)
- March 12
  - Tyler Clary, Olympic swimmer
  - Austin Kelly, basketball coach
- March 13
  - Joshua Allen, dancer and So You Think You Can Dance winner (d. 2025)
  - Jordan Lane Price, actress, singer, and model
- March 14
  - Jay Jones, politician
  - Colby O'Donis, singer
- March 15g
  - Brandon Barden, football player
  - Ben Blood, ice hockey player
  - LaVon Brazill, football player
  - Jordan Feliz, Christian singer/songwriter
  - Gil Roberts, Olympic printer
  - Caitlin Wachs, actress
- March 16
  - Michael Blazek, baseball player
  - Shannon Breen, football player
  - Brian M. Rosenthal, investigative journalist
  - Blake Griffin, basketball player
- March 17
  - Bront Bird, football player
  - Mason Musso, musician and singer/songwriter
  - Ronnie Canizaro, singer and frontman for Born of Osiris
- March 18
  - Jonathan Ahdout, actor
  - Lily Collins, British-born actress
- March 19
  - Ben Briley, singer
  - Vincent Hancock, Olympic skeet shooter
- March 20
  - Heather Bergsma, Olympic speed skater
  - Tommy Ford, Olympic Alpine skier
- March 21
  - Matt Blanchard, football player
  - Bryan Bulaga, football player
- March 22
  - Broderick Adé Hogue, art director, designer, and letterer (d. 2021)
  - Tyler Oakley, YouTube and podcast personality
  - Karen Rodriguez, singer
  - J. J. Watt, American Football player
- March 25
  - James Anderson, basketball player
  - Allen Bailey, football player
  - Bree Boyce, beauty pageant winner
  - Aly Michalka, actress and singer
- March 26
  - Josiah Leming, singer
  - Von Miller, football player
- March 28 – Nick Boulle, racing driver

=== April ===
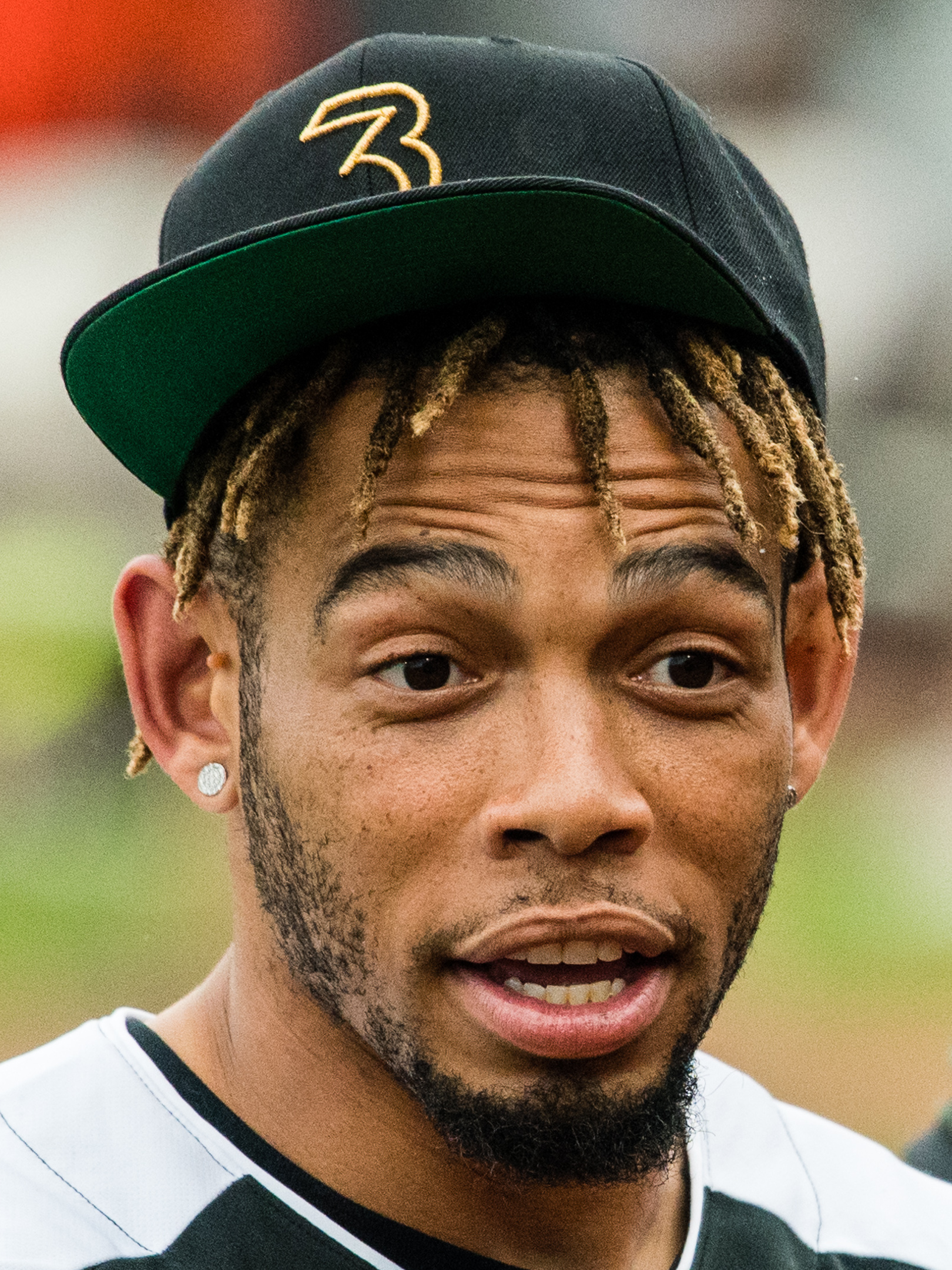
Joe Haden

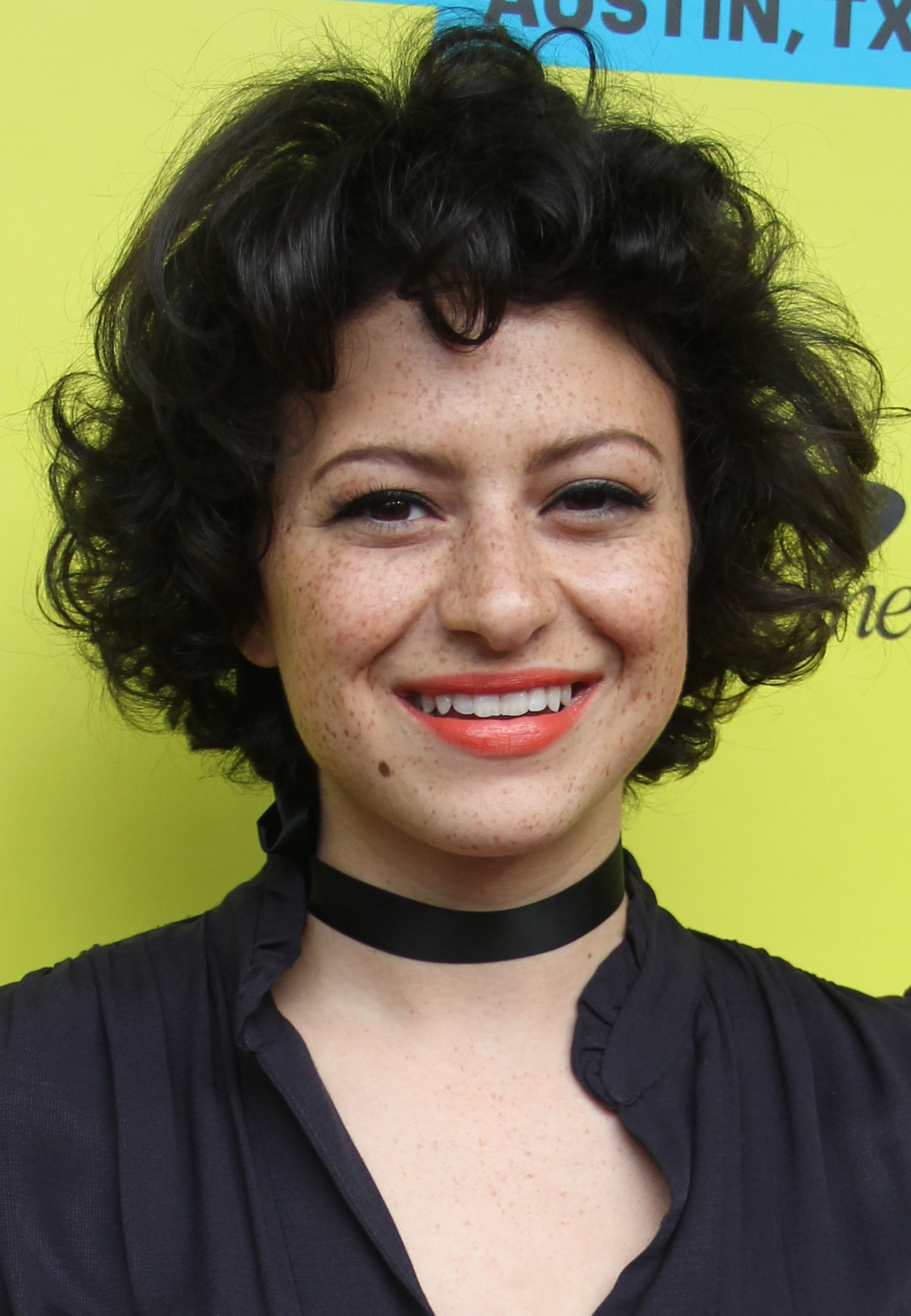
Alia Shawkat

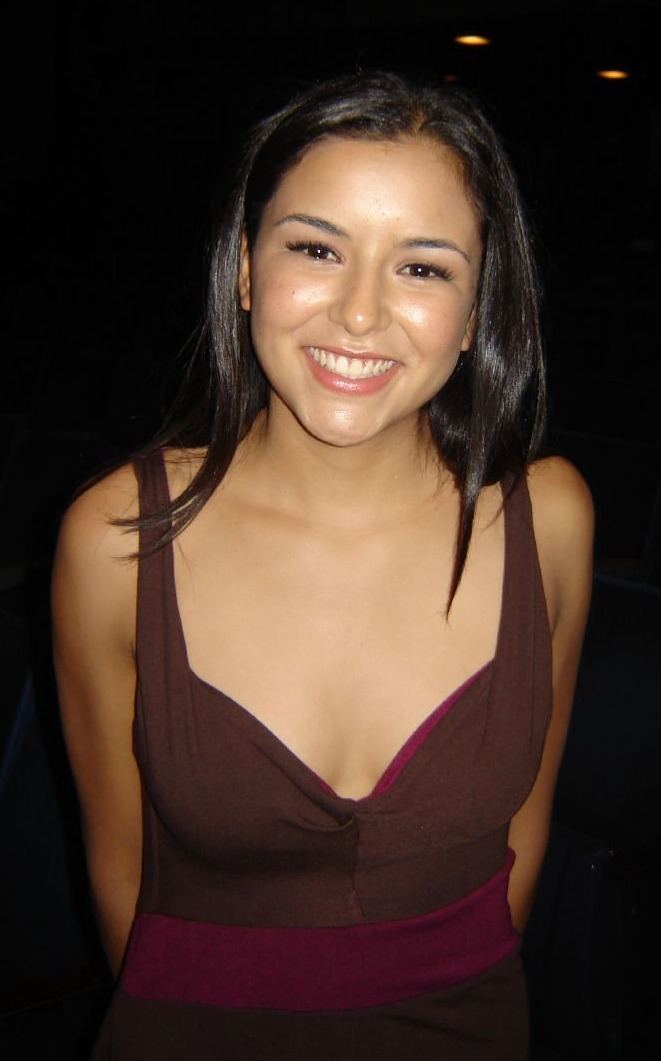
Emily Rios

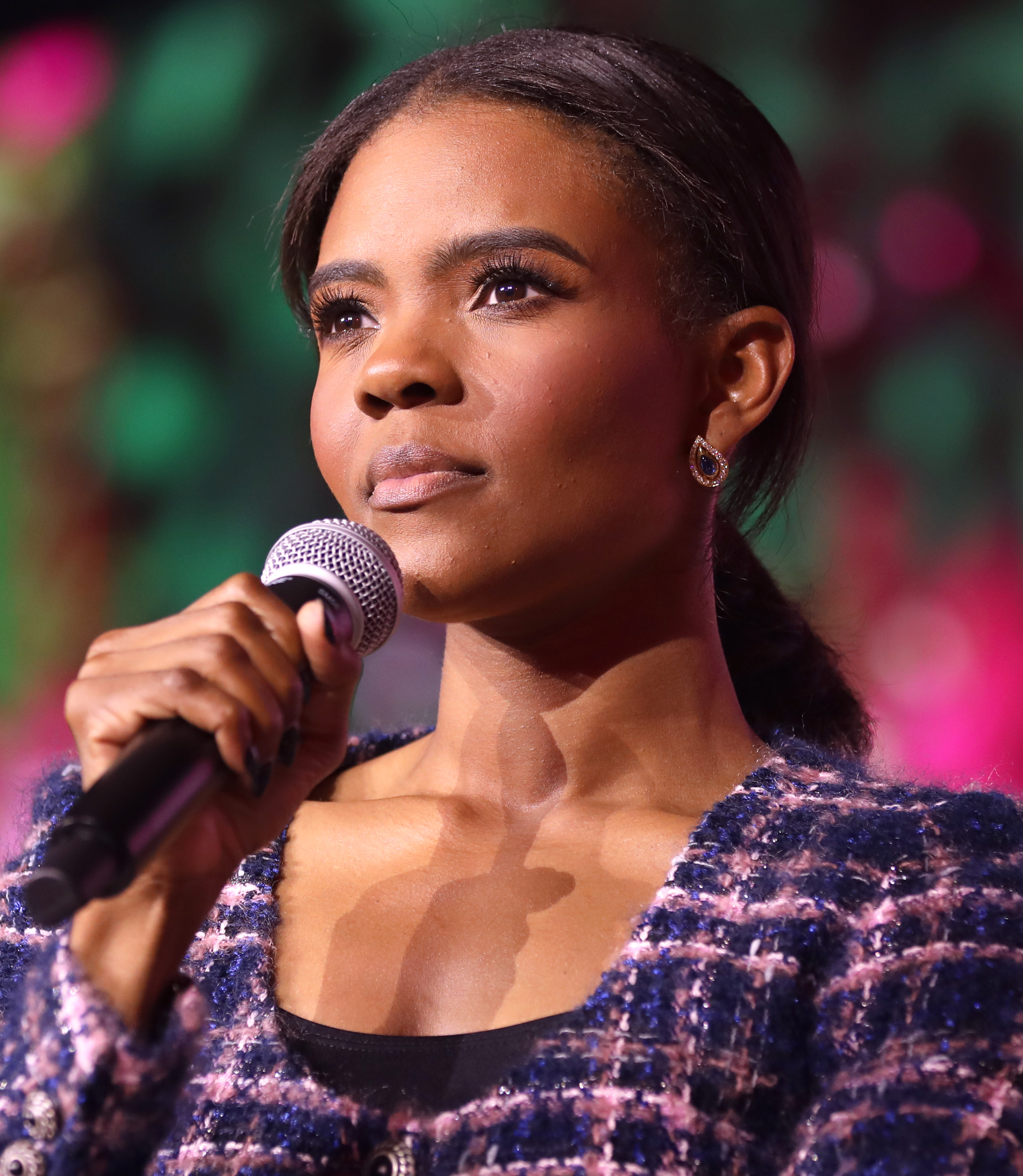
Candace Owens

- April 2 – Nicole Baukus, convicted criminal
- April 3 – T. J. Brennan, ice hockey player
- April 5
  - Audrey Bolte, beauty pageant winner
  - Kris Bowers, composer and pianist
- April 8 – Nicholas Megalis, singer/songwriter
- April 9
  - Bianca Belair, wrestler
  - Danielle Kahle, figure skater
- April 10
  - Valerie Arioto, softball player
  - Richard Helms, businessman
  - Juice Robinson, pro wrestler
- April 11
  - Blake Brettschneider, soccer player
  - Zola Jesus, singer
- April 12
  - Greg Blum, soccer player
  - iLoveMakonnen, rapper
- April 13
  - Ryan Bailey, Olympic sprinter
  - Anamika Bhargava, tennis player
- April 14 – Joe Haden, football player
- April 16
  - Baths, musician
  - Mia Yim, wrestler
- April 17
  - Darius Adams, American-born Bulgarian basketball player
  - Avi Kaplan, a cappella singer and member of Pentatonix
  - Beau Knapp, actor
- April 18
  - Don Barclay, football player
  - Jessica Jung, American-born Korean singer
  - Alia Shawkat, actress
- April 19
  - Tori Anthony, pole vaulter
  - Ashley Everett, dancer and actress
- April 20
  - Shane Bannon, football player
  - Nina Davuluri, public speaker, advocate, and beauty pageant titleholder, Miss America 2014
  - Han Hee-jun, Korean-American singer
- April 21 – Tatyana McFadden, Russian-born paralympian athlete
- April 22
  - DeJuan Blair, basketball player
  - Chance Barrow, wrestler
- April 23
  - Anastasia Baranova, Russian-born actress
  - Kate Buesser, ice hockey player
- April 24
  - David Boudia, Olympic diver
  - Thomas Sanders, influencer
- April 25 – Joe Bendik, soccer player
- April 26
  - Cole Beasley, football player
  - Chad Bettis, baseball player
- April 27
  - La'Shard Anderson, basketball player
  - Martha Hunt, model
  - Emily Rios. actress
- April 28
  - Kenjon Barner, football player
  - Stephen Ettinger, mountain biker
- April 29
  - Gabriel Chavarria, actor
  - Candace Owens, conservative author, talk show host, political commentator, and activist
- April 30
  - Armando Allen, football player
  - Baauer, record producer and DJ

=== May ===
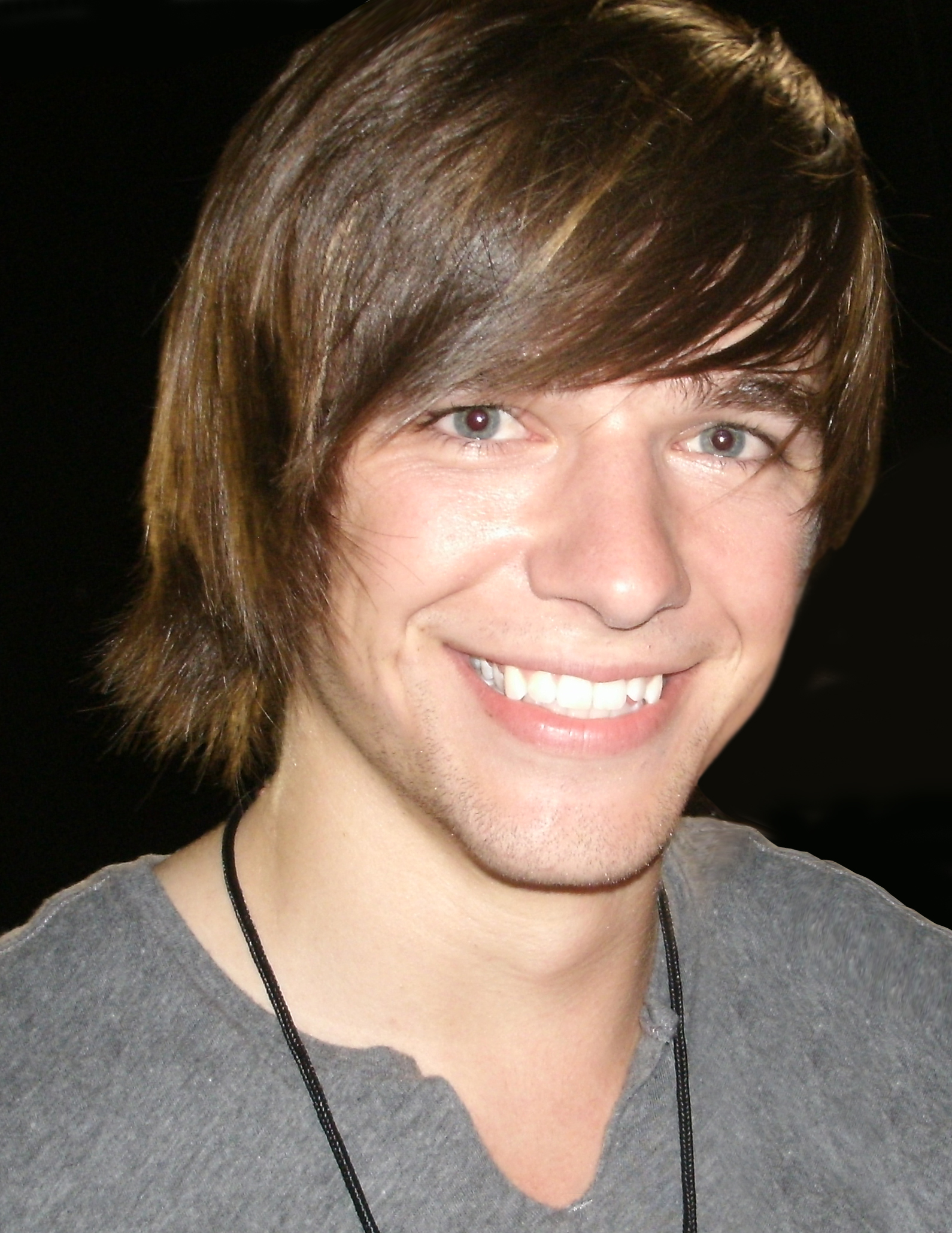
Tim Urban

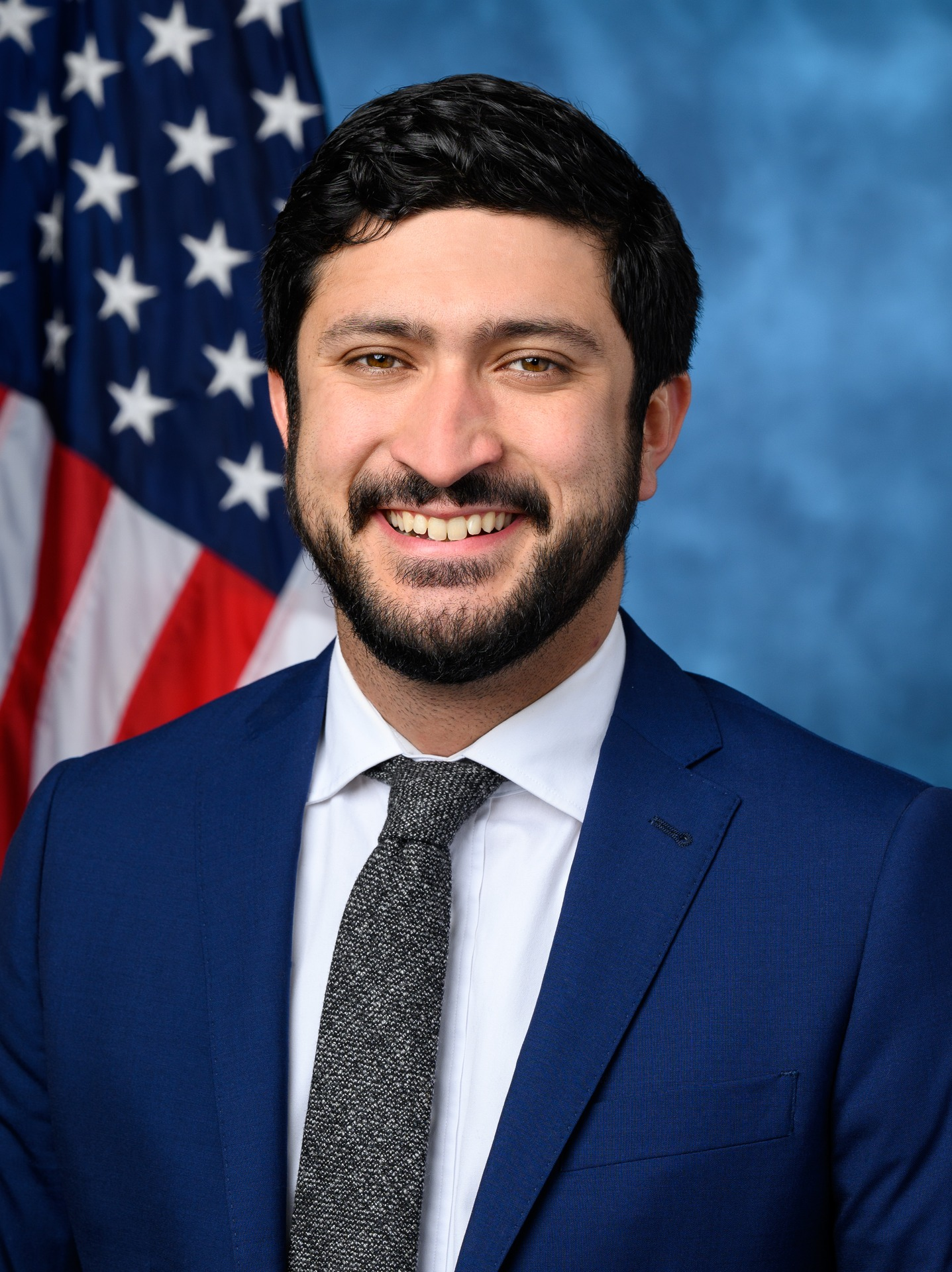
Greg Casar

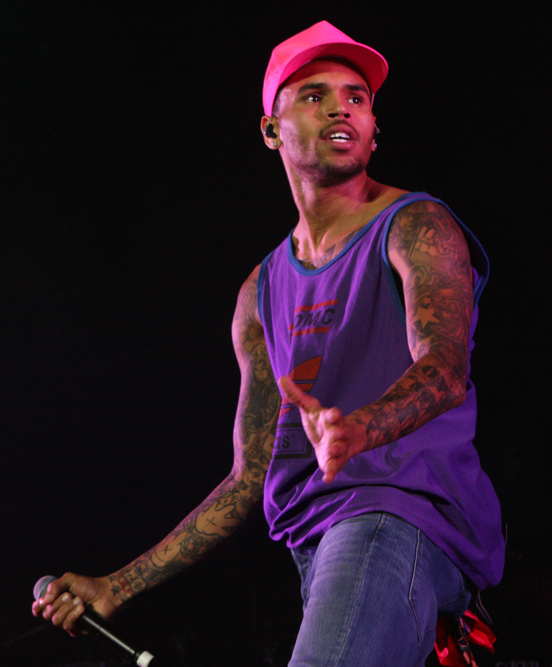
Chris Brown

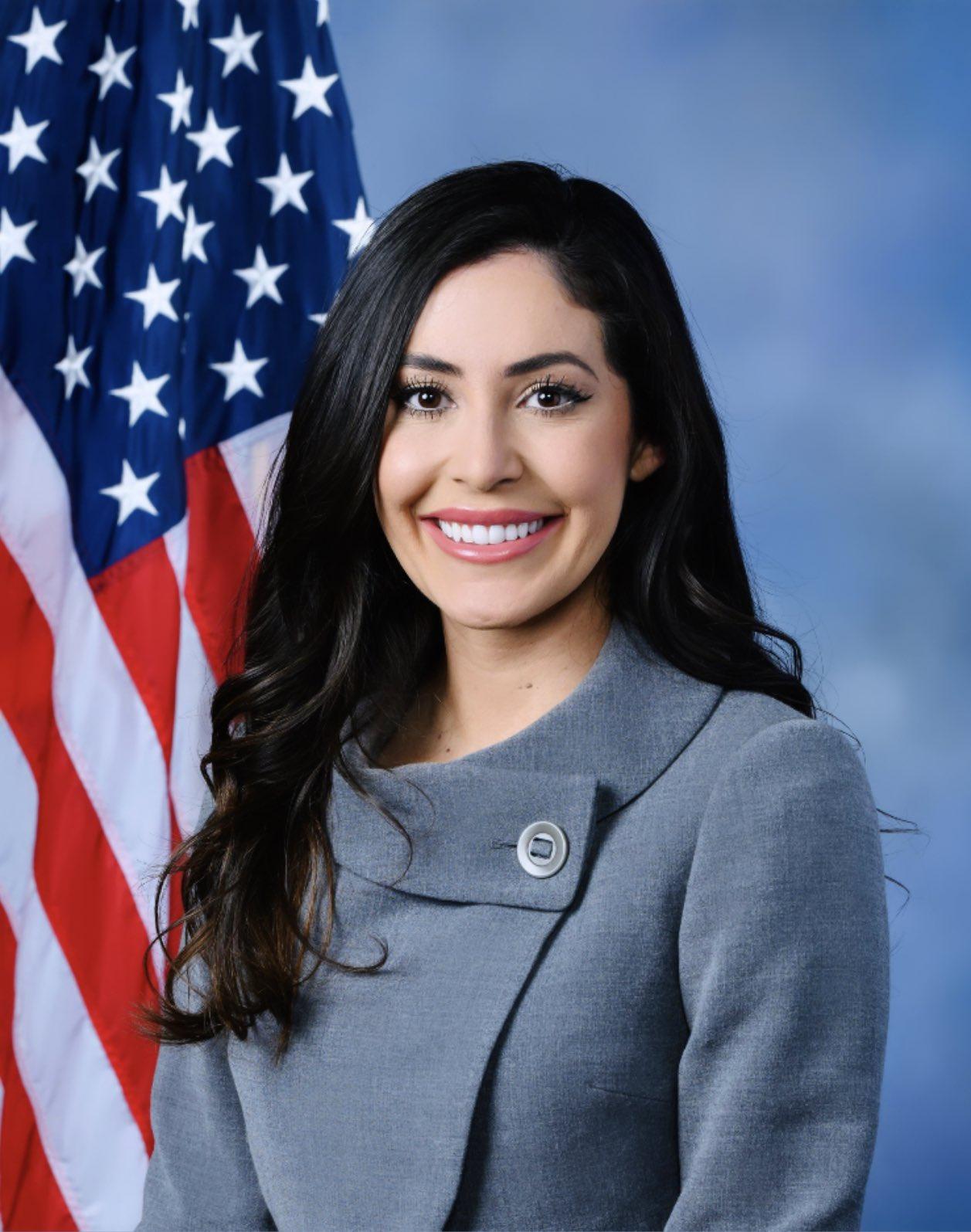
Anna Paulina Luna

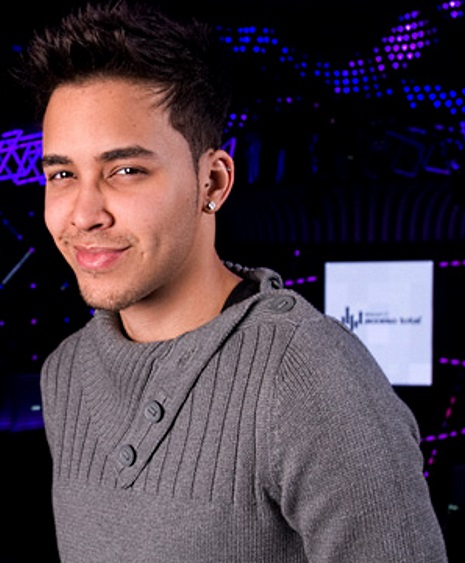
Prince Royce

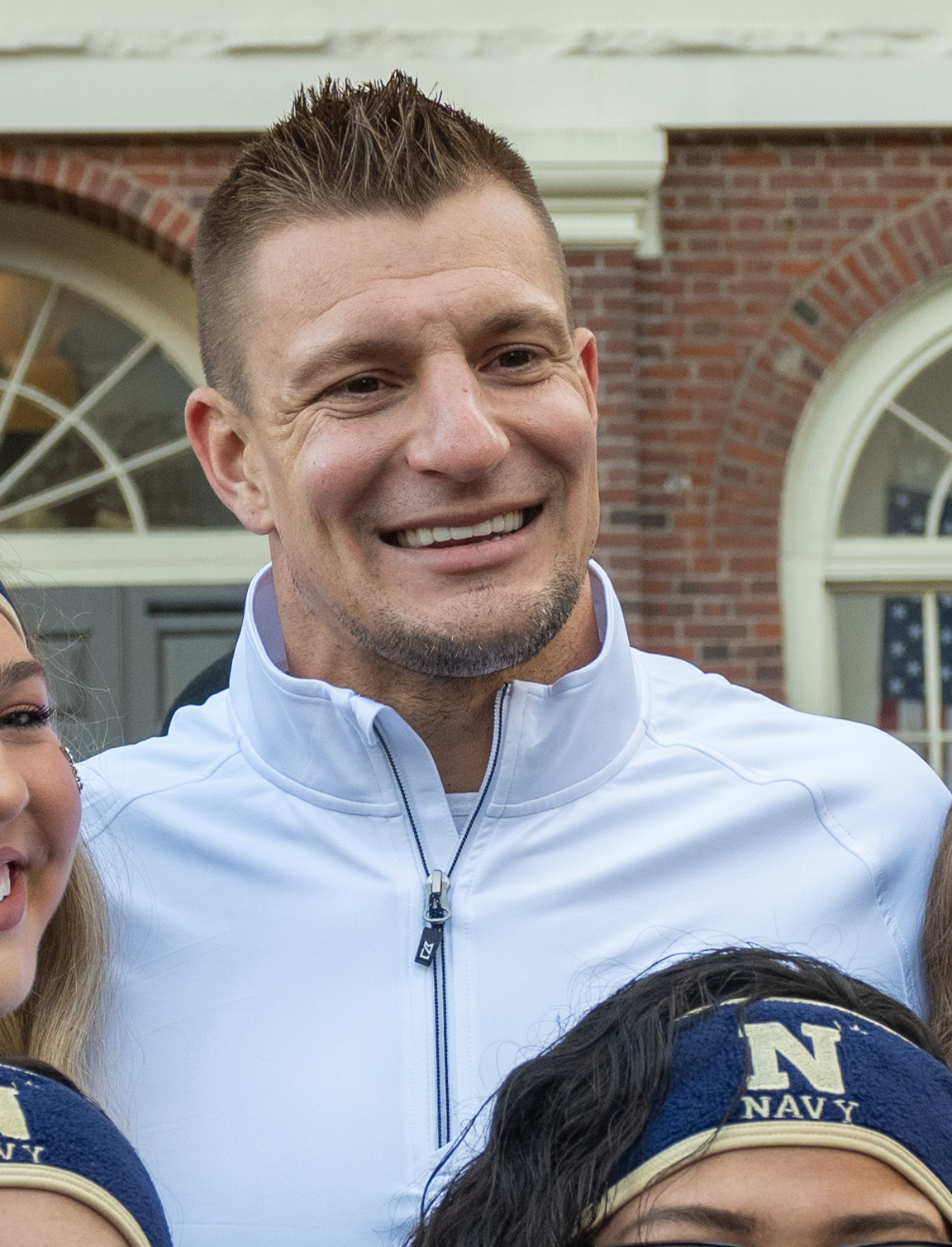
Rob Gronkowski

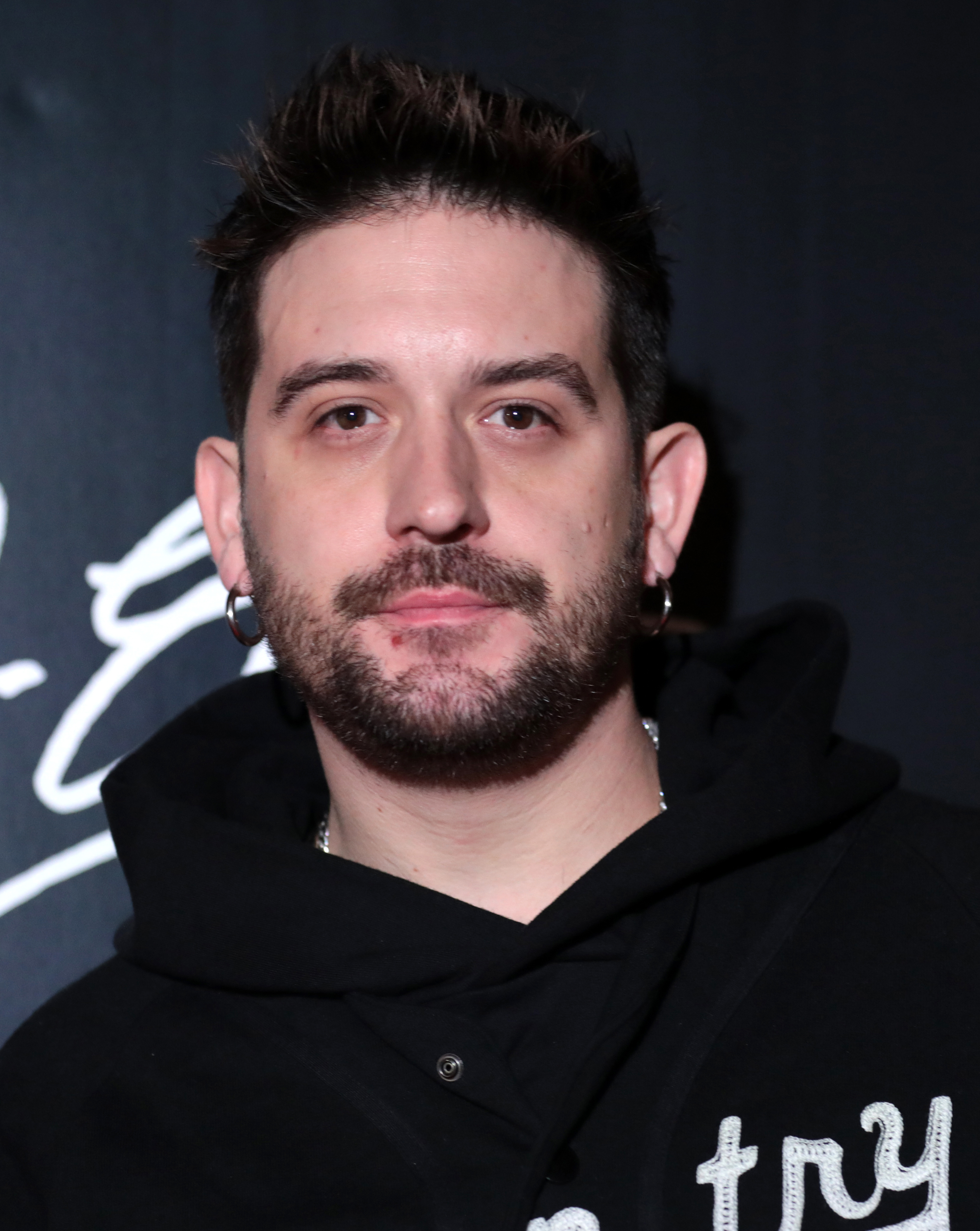
G-Eazy

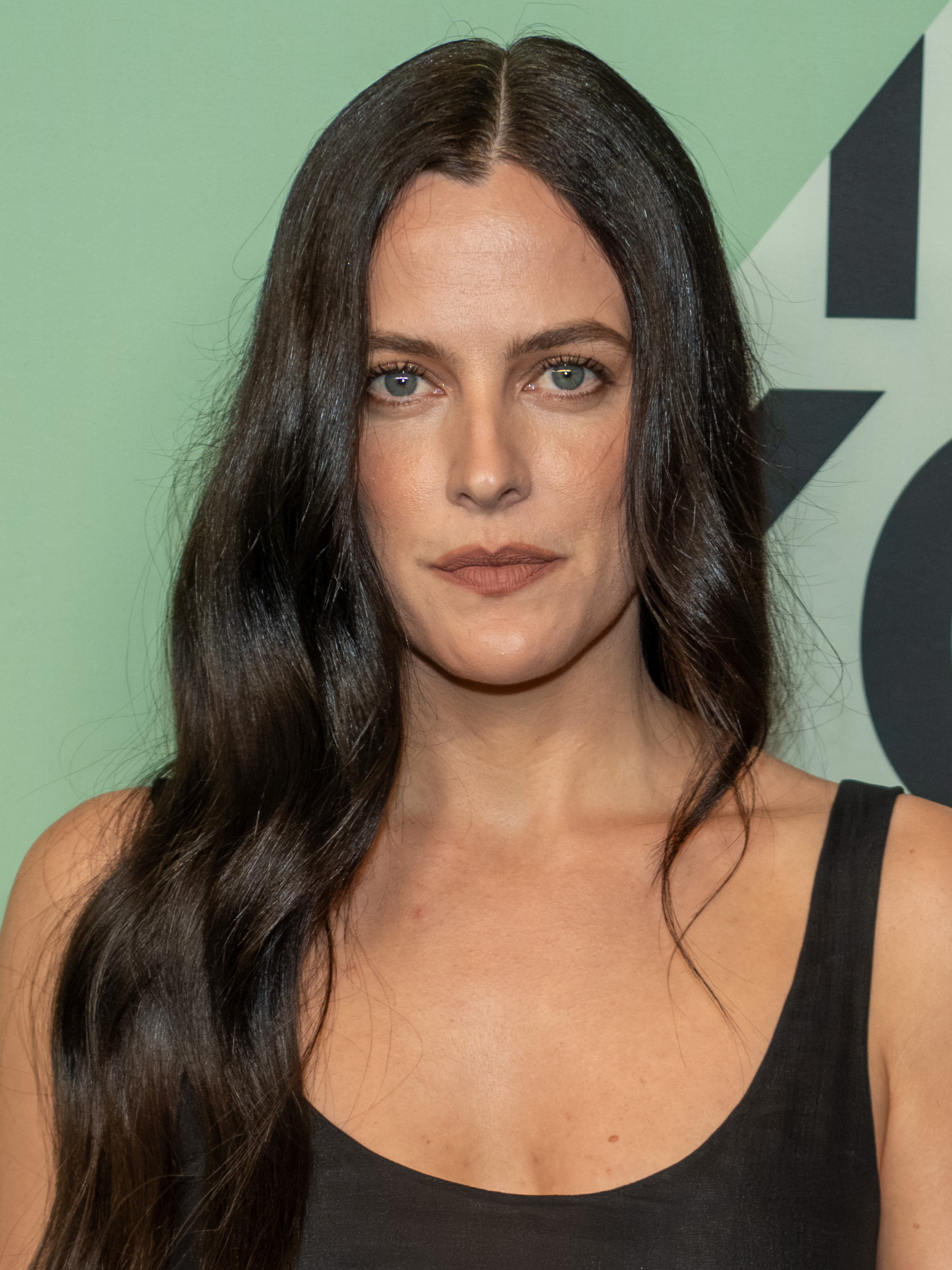
Riley Keough

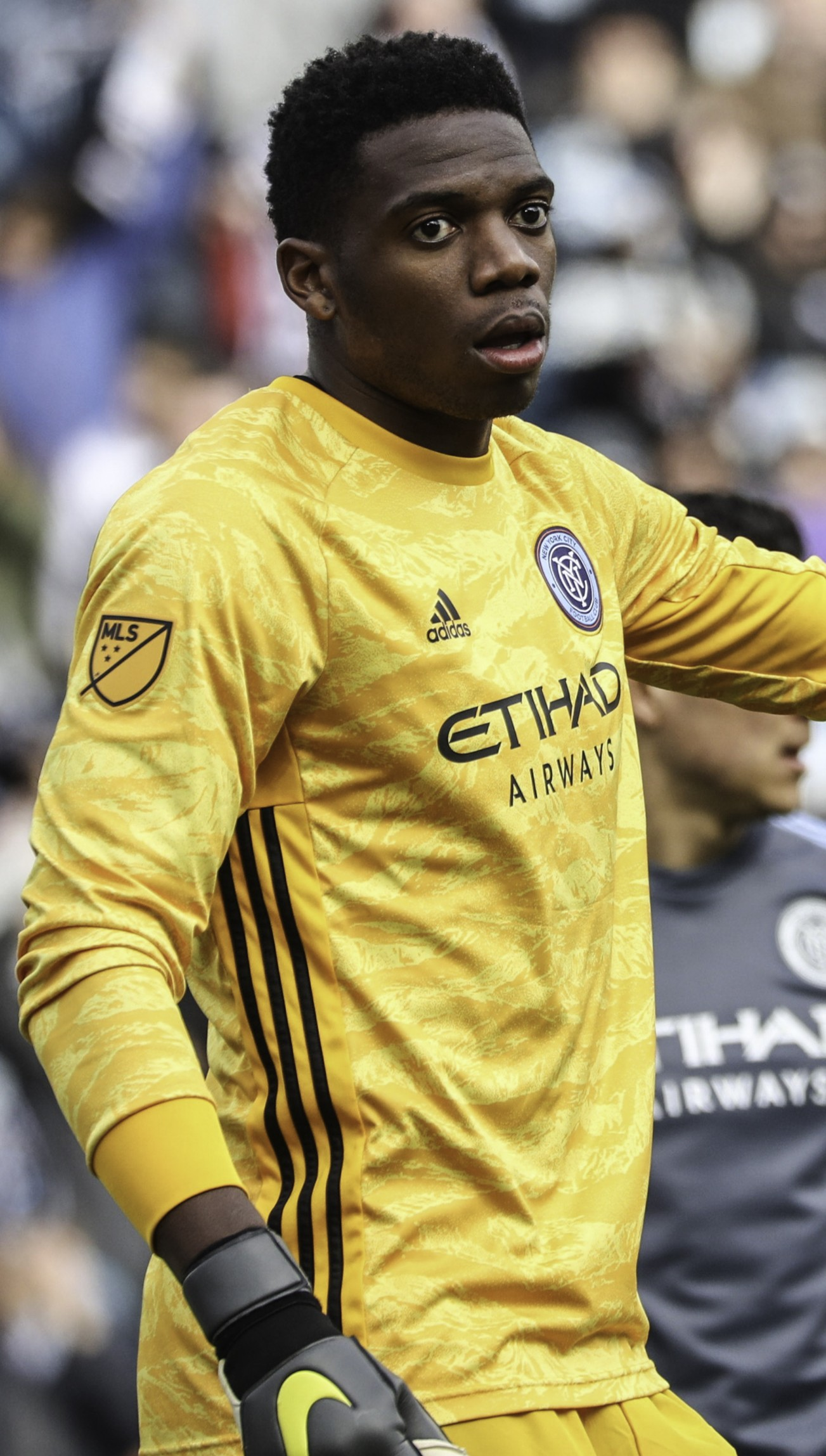
Sean Johnson

- May 1
  - Denzel Bowles, basketball player
  - Tim Urban, actor, singer/songwriter, and American Idol, contestant
- May 2
  - Graham Alexander, singer/songwriter, entertainer, and entrepreneur
  - Tommy Brenton, basketball player
- May 3
  - Anya Alvarez, golfer and writer
  - Bryan Barberena, mixed martial artist
  - Brandon Bostick, football player
- May 4
  - Greg Casar, politician
  - James van Riemsdyk, hockey player
- May 5 – Chris Brown, singer and actor
- May 6 – Anna Paulina Luna, Air Force veteran and politician
- May 7 – Earl Thomas, football player
- May 8
  - Andrew Blaser, Olympic skeleton racer
  - Brandon Bogotay, football player
  - Nyle DiMarco, model and activist
  - Reckful, Twitch streamer (d. 2020)
- May 9
  - Becca, singer/songwriter and guitarist
  - Clint Boling, football player
- May 10
  - Drew Butler, football player
  - Marisha Ray, voice actress
  - Lindsey Shaw, actress
  - Jesse Vargas, boxer and political candidate
  - Gabrielle Walsh, actress
- May 11
  - David Buchanan, baseball player
  - Pratyush Buddiga, New Zealand-born poker player
  - Tyler Carron, Paralympic ice sled hockey player
  - Cam Newton, football player
  - Prince Royce, singer/songwriter
- May 12
  - Nick Bellore, football player
  - Kylee Botterman, gymnast
- May 14 – Rob Gronkowski, football player
- May 15 – Sunny Lee, American-born Korean singer
- May 16 – Bill Bentley, football player
- May 17
  - Olivia Luccardi, actress and producer
  - James Talarico, politician
- May 18
  - Fatima Ali, Pakistani-born chef (d. 2019)
  - Nathan Bartholomay, Olympic pair figure skater
  - Alan Becker, online animater and YouTuber
  - Josh Bellamy, football player
  - Leif Nordgren, Olympic biathlete
- May 19 – Gaelan Connell, actor and musician
- May 20 – Grant Amato, convicted murderer
- May 21 – Rodney Bartholomew, basketball player
- May 22
  - Drake Britton, baseball player
  - Trevor Reckling, baseball player
- May 24
  - G-Eazy, hip-hop rapper and producer
  - Lelia Broussard, musician and member of Jupiter Winter
  - Kalin Lucas, basketball player
  - Tara Correa-McMullen, actress (d. 2005)
  - Sarah Reich, tap dancer
- May 25 – Steven Krueger, actor
- May 26 – Chad Billins, ice hockey player
- May 28 – Isaac Butts, basketball player
- May 29
  - Ezekiel Ansah, Ghanaian-born football player
  - Riley Keough, actress
  - Brandon Mychal Smith, actor
- May 30
  - Kamar Aiken, football player
  - Ailee, Korean-born singer/songwriter
  - Greg Billington, Olympic triathlete
  - Kevin Covais, actor and singer
- May 31
  - Lauren Barnes, soccer player
  - Jordan Bernstine, football player
  - Noah Gundersen, singer/songwriter and guitarist
  - Sean Johnson, soccer player
  - Justine Lupe, actress

=== June ===
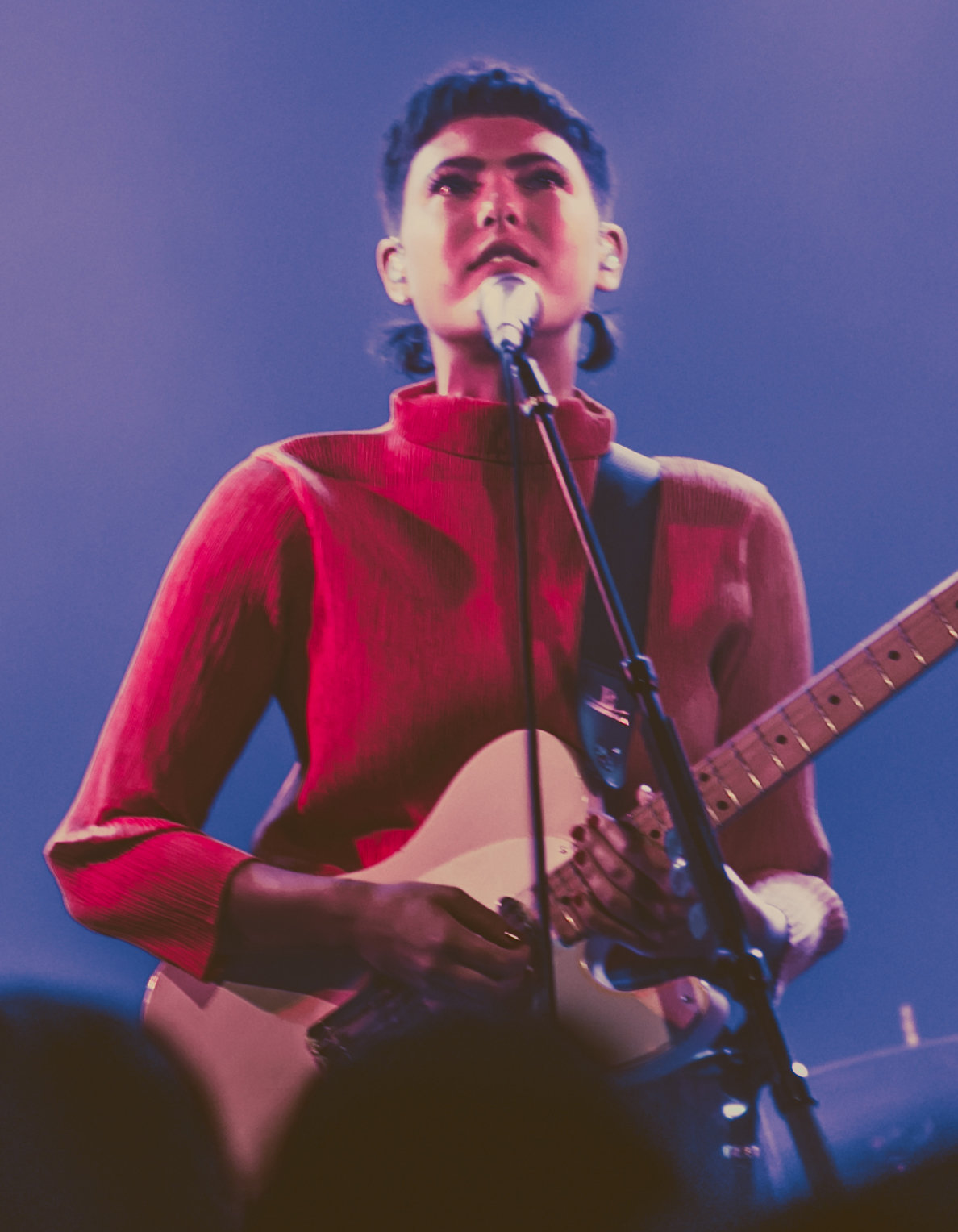
Miya Folick

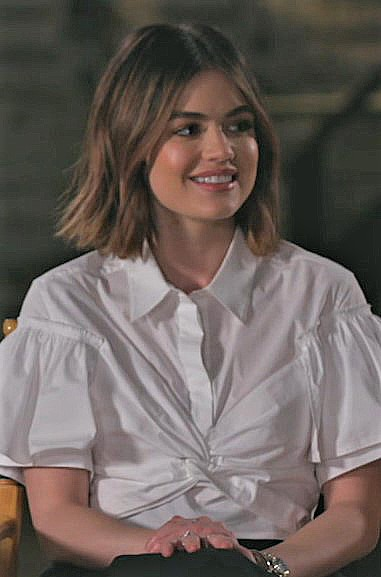
Lucy Hale

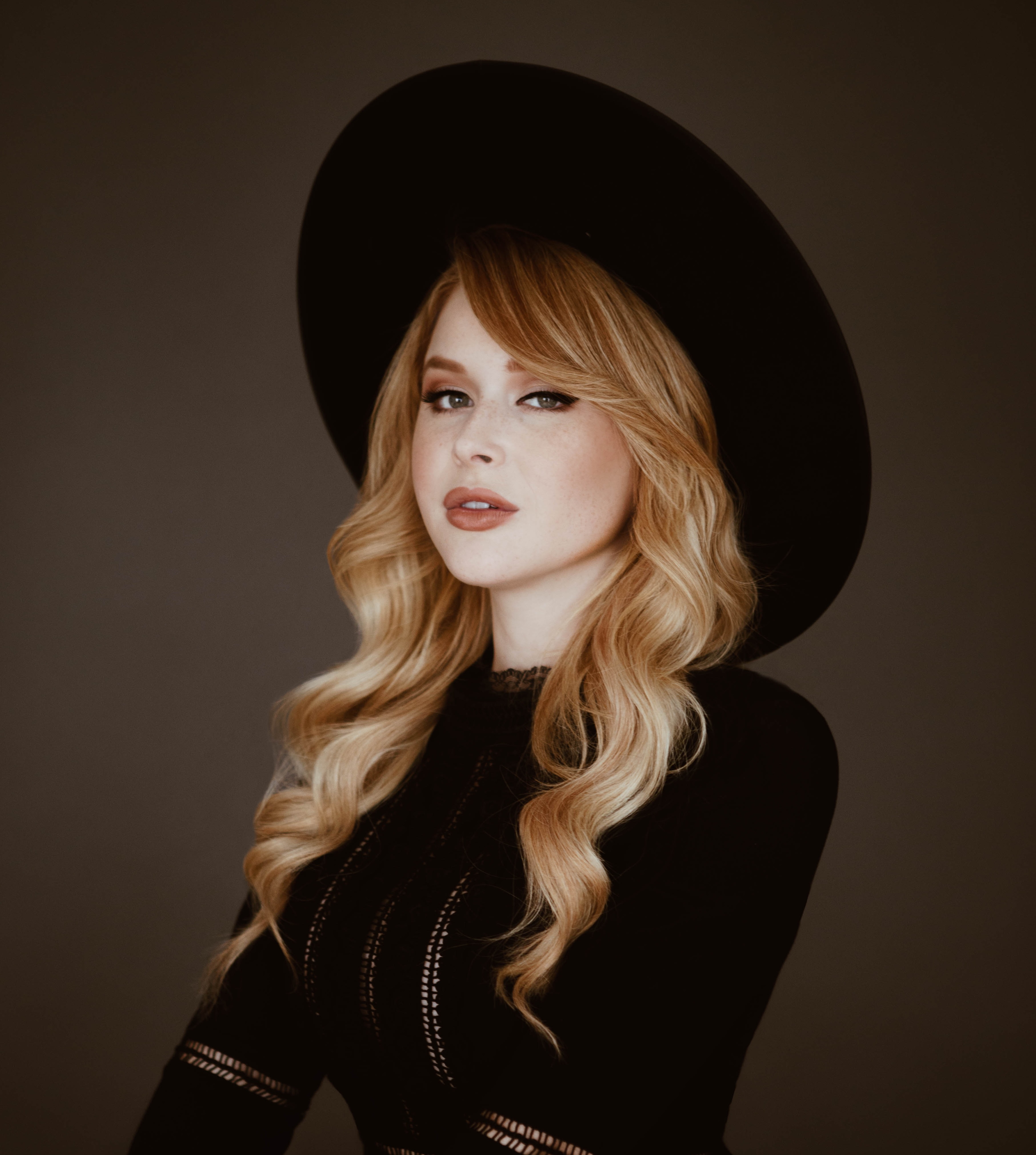
Renee Olstead

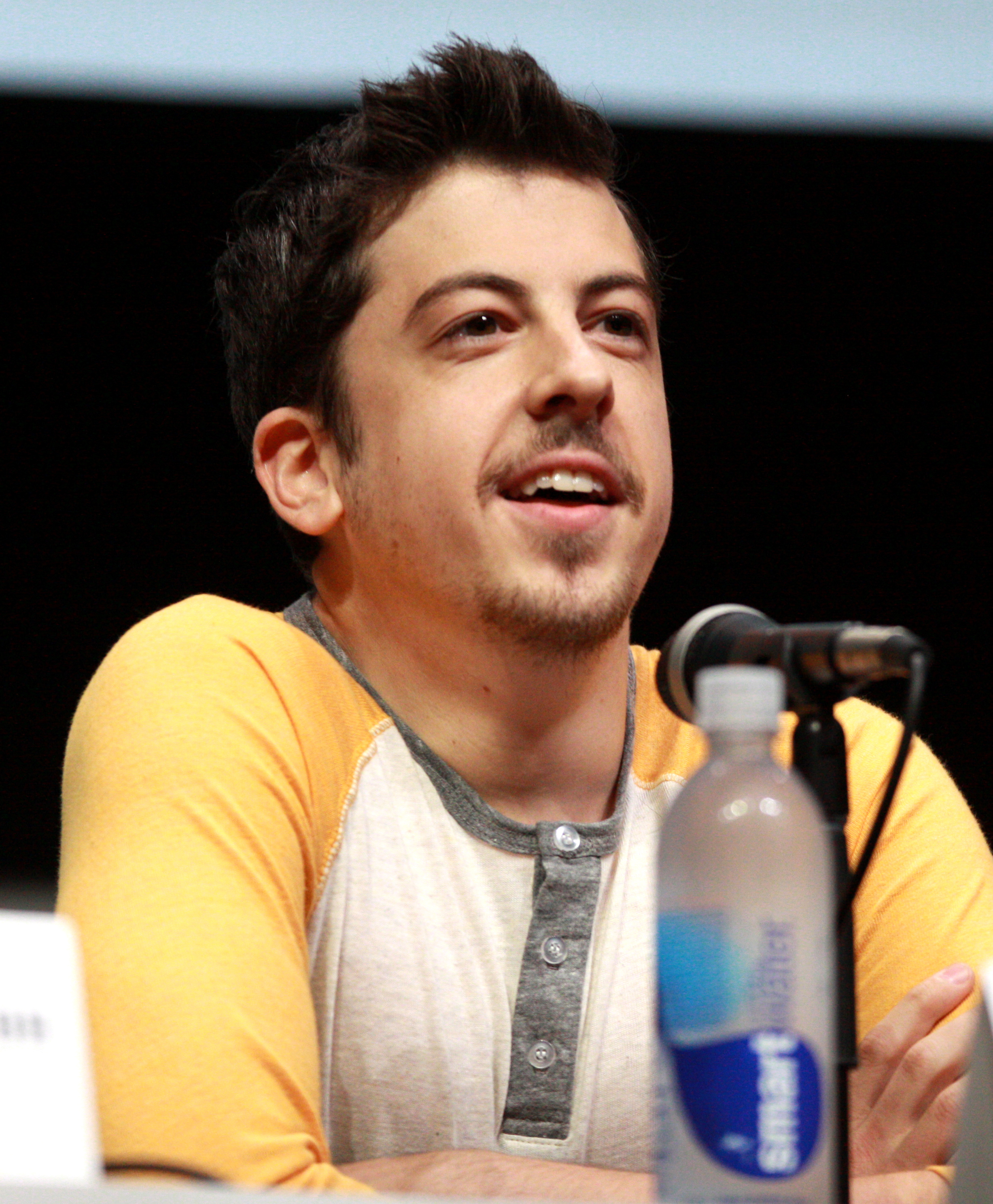
Christopher Mintz-Plasse

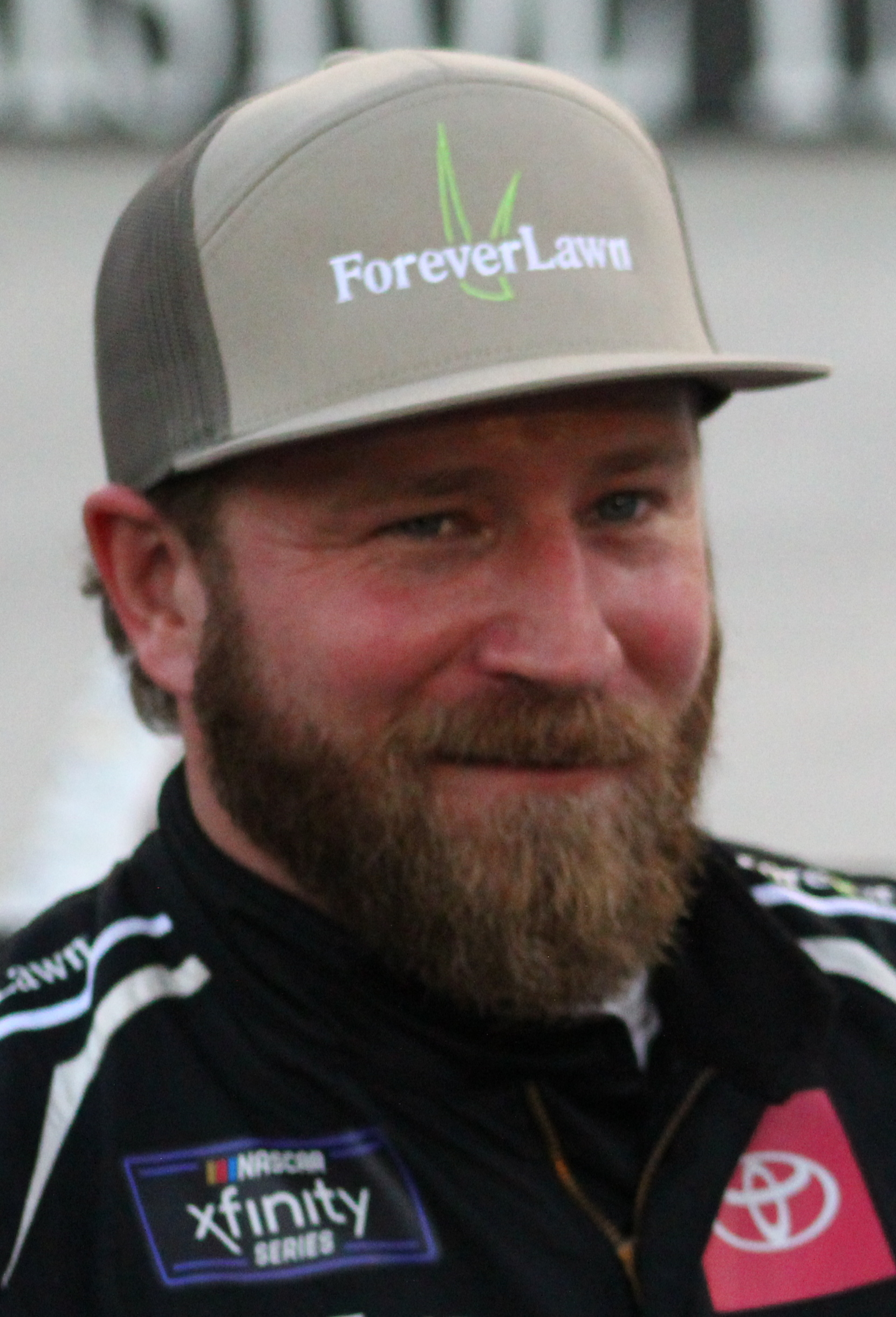
Jeffrey Earnhardt

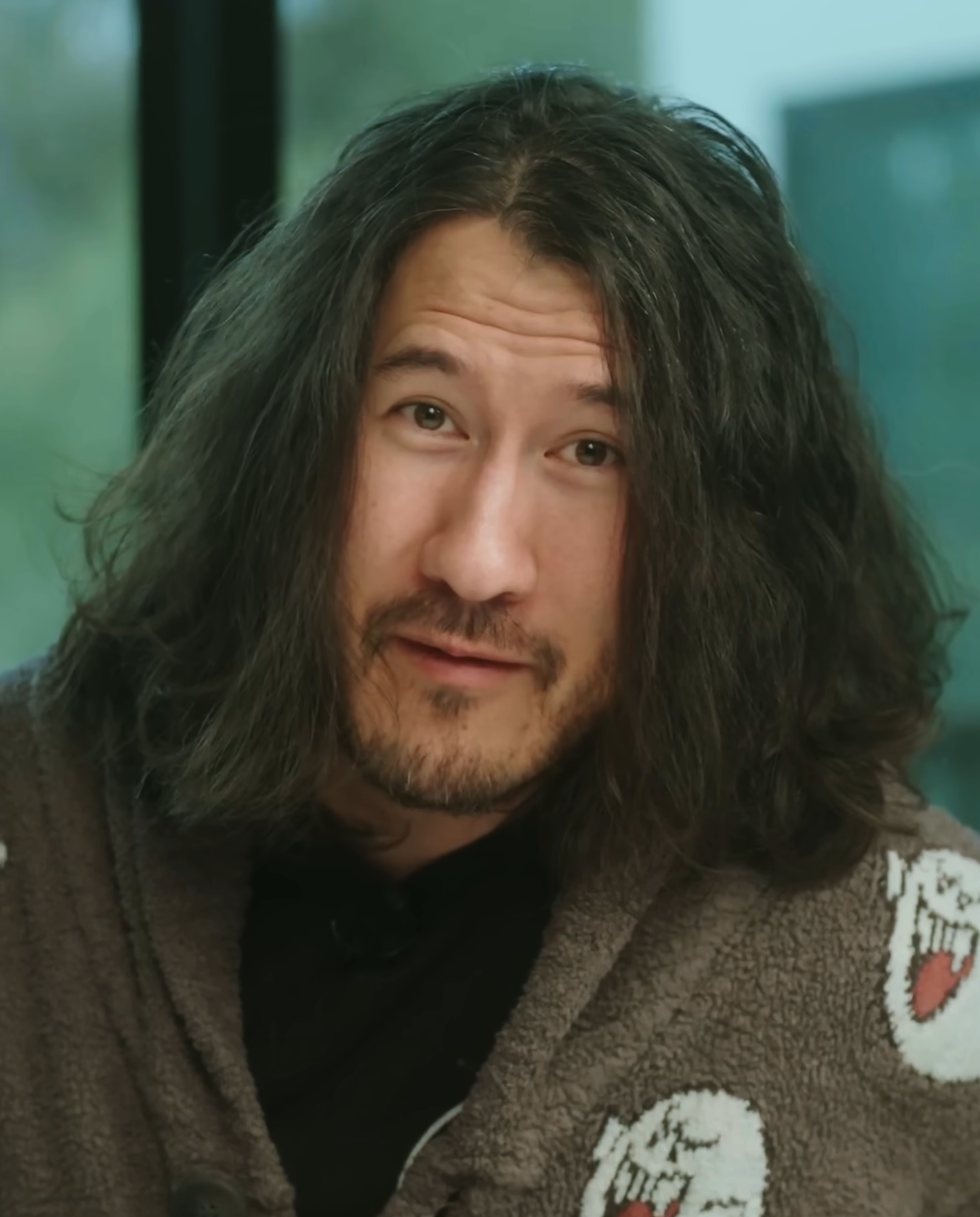
Markiplier

- June 1
  - Chaisson Allen, basketball player and coach
  - Trey Britton, basketball player
  - Brandon Taylor, writer
- June 2
  - Freddy Adu, Ghanaian-born soccer player
  - Rowan Hisayo Buchanan, writer
  - Austin Davis, football player
  - Cooper Helfet, football player
- June 3 – Jillette Johnson, singer
- June 4 – Saul Almeida, Brazilian-born boxer and mixed martial artist
- June 5 – Cam Atkinson, hockey player
- June 6
  - Prince Amukamara, football player
  - Matt Broha, football player
  - Dusty Button, ballerina
  - Jeanna Giese, rabies survivor
- June 8 – Kelvin Beachum, football player
- June 9
  - Bill Algeo, mixed martial artist
  - Logan Browning, actress
  - Miya Folick, singer/songwriter
- June 10 – DeAndre Kane, basketball player
- June 11
  - Cryaotic, YouTuber and internet personality
  - Maya Moore, basketball player
  - Chris Roettler, singer and frontman for Like Moths to Flames
- June 12
  - Dallas Beeler, baseball player
  - Jud Birza, model and television personality
  - Jeff Brooks, American-born Italian basketball player
- June 13
  - Jude Brewer, writer, producer, actor, and podcast host
  - Lisa Tucker, singer and actress
- June 14
  - Shane Austin, football player
  - Peter Avalon, wrestler
  - Benjamin Booker, musician, singer/songwriter, and guitarist
  - Lucy Hale, actress and singer
- June 15
  - Alyssa Farah Griffin, political strategist and TV personality
  - Bayley, wrestler
- June 16 – AraabMuzik, record producer and DJ
- June 17
  - Simone Battle, actress and singer (d. 2014)
  - Monica Barbaro, actress
- June 18 – Renee Olstead, actress and singer
- June 20
  - Luke Babbitt, basketball player
  - Christopher Mintz-Plasse, actor
  - Terrelle Pryor, football player
- June 21 – Jamar Abrams, basketball player
- June 22
  - Jeshua Anderson, sprinter and hurdler
  - Jeffrey Earnhardt, race car driver
- June 23 – Chasten Buttigieg, teacher, writer, and LGBTQ rights advocate
- June 24
  - Jamie Blatnick, football player
  - Rafi Gavron, English-born actor
- June 25 – Chris Brochu, actor and singer/songwriter
- June 27 – Kimiko Glenn, actress and singer
- June 28
  - Joe Kovacs, Olympic shot putter
  - Markiplier, YouTube personality
  - Alex T. Marshall, guitarist and pianist for The Cab
- June 29
  - Gwen Berry, Olympic hammer thrower
  - Sylvia Hoffman, Olympic bobsledder
- June 30 – Adam Bice, football player

=== July ===
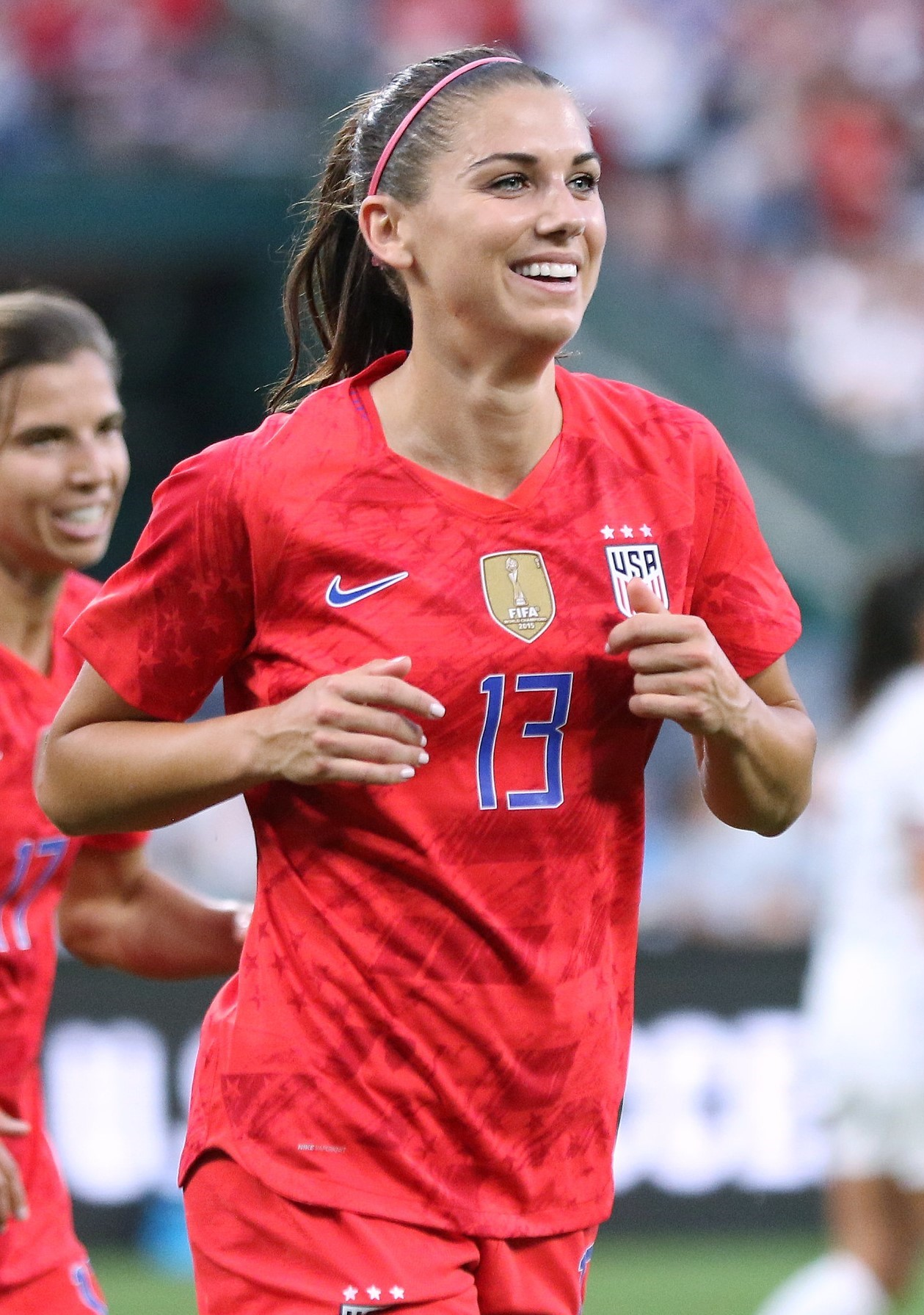
Alex Morgan

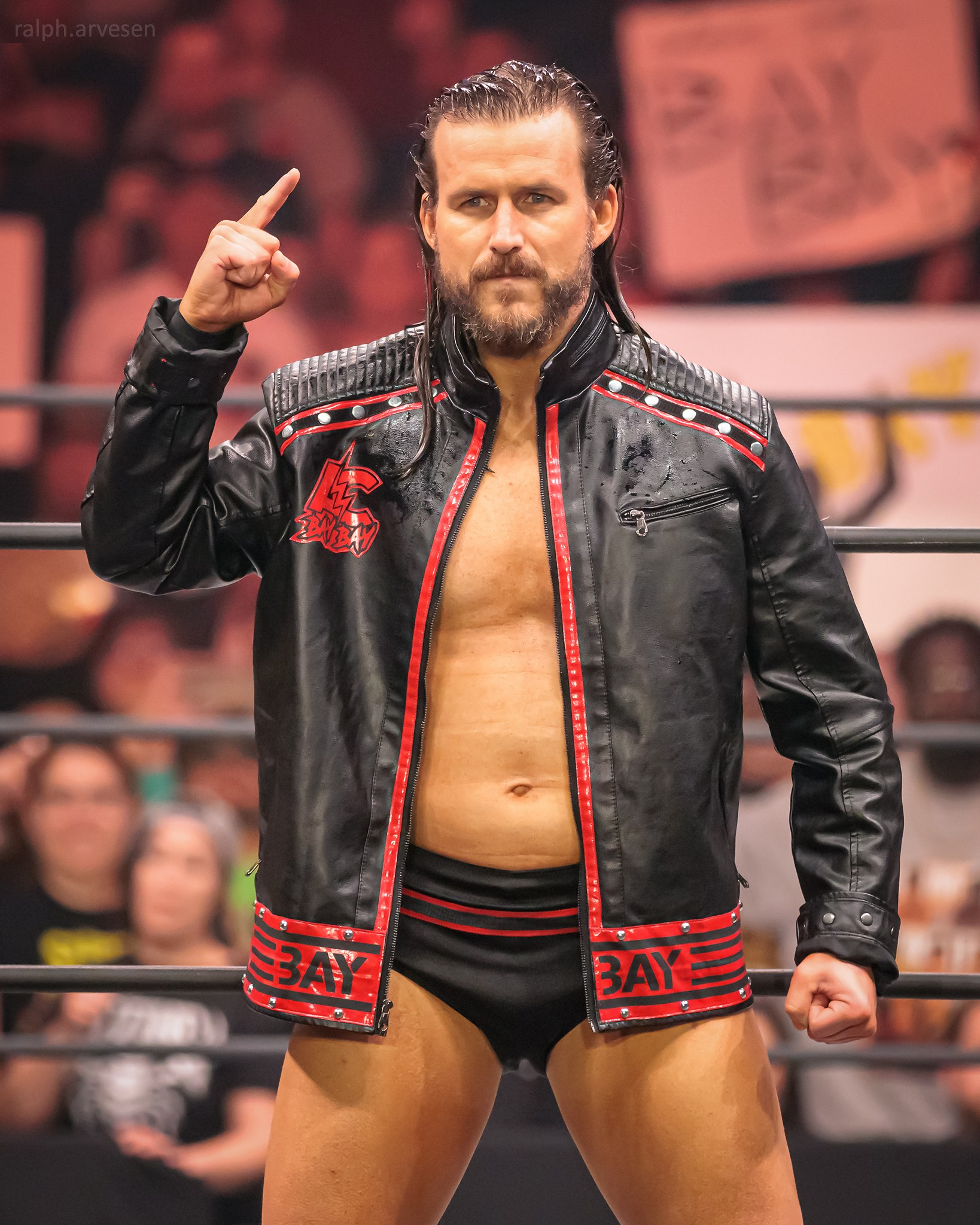
Adam Cole

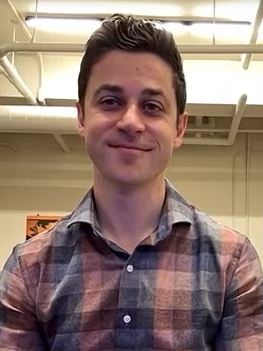
David Henrie

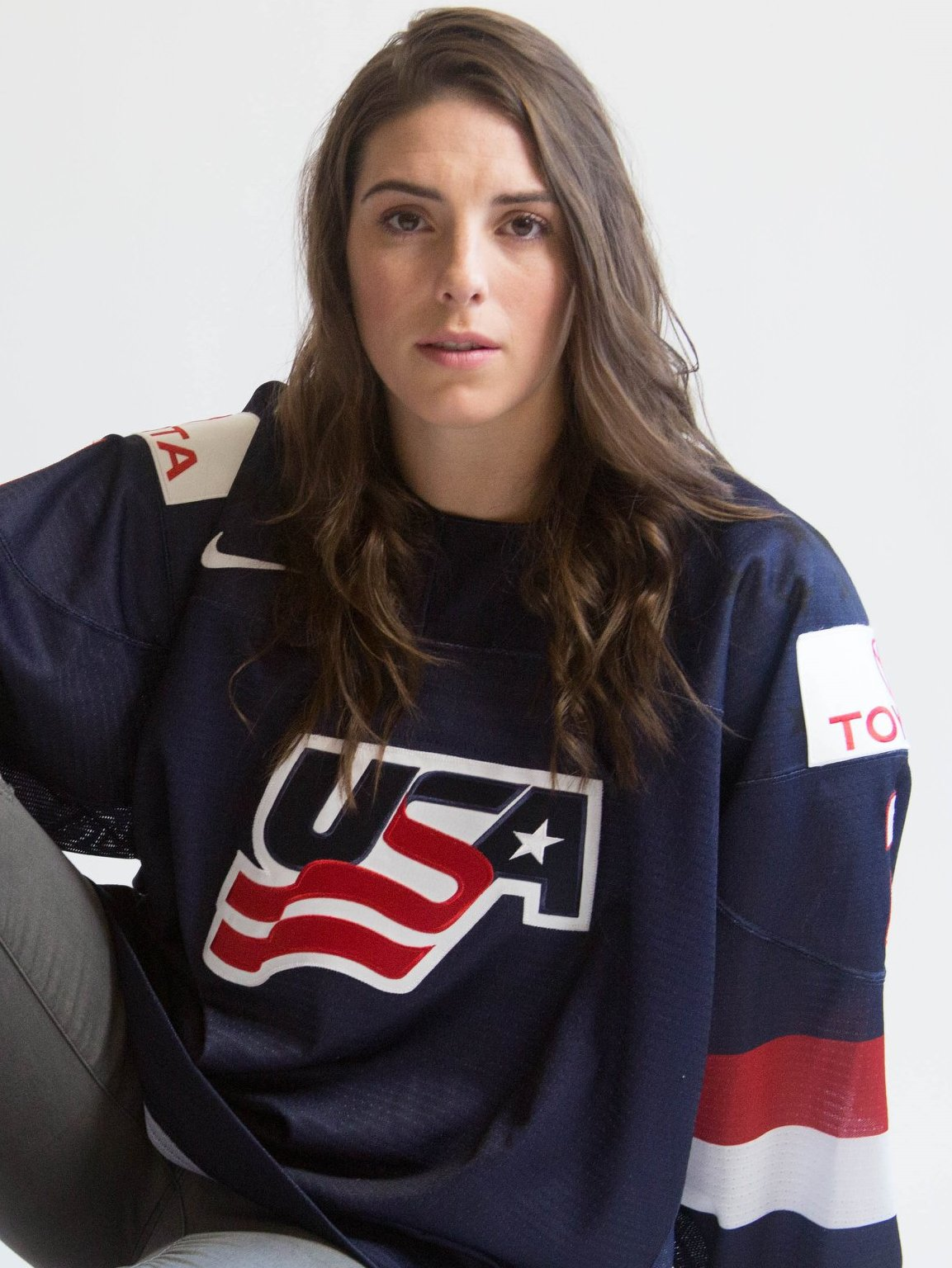
Hilary Knight

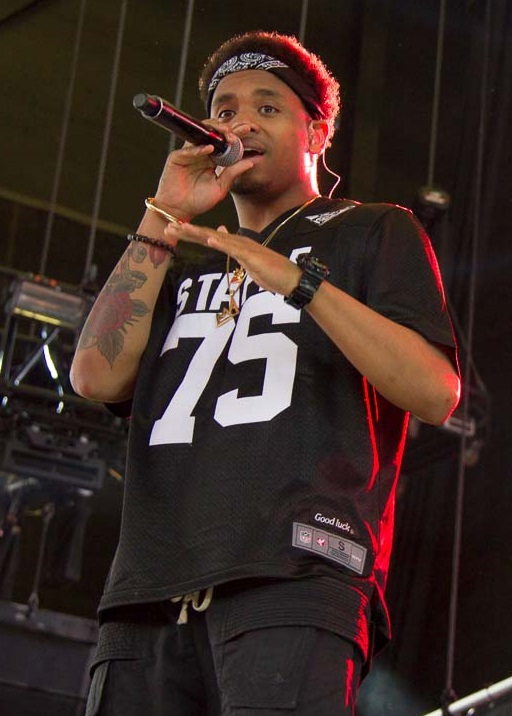
Tristan Wilds

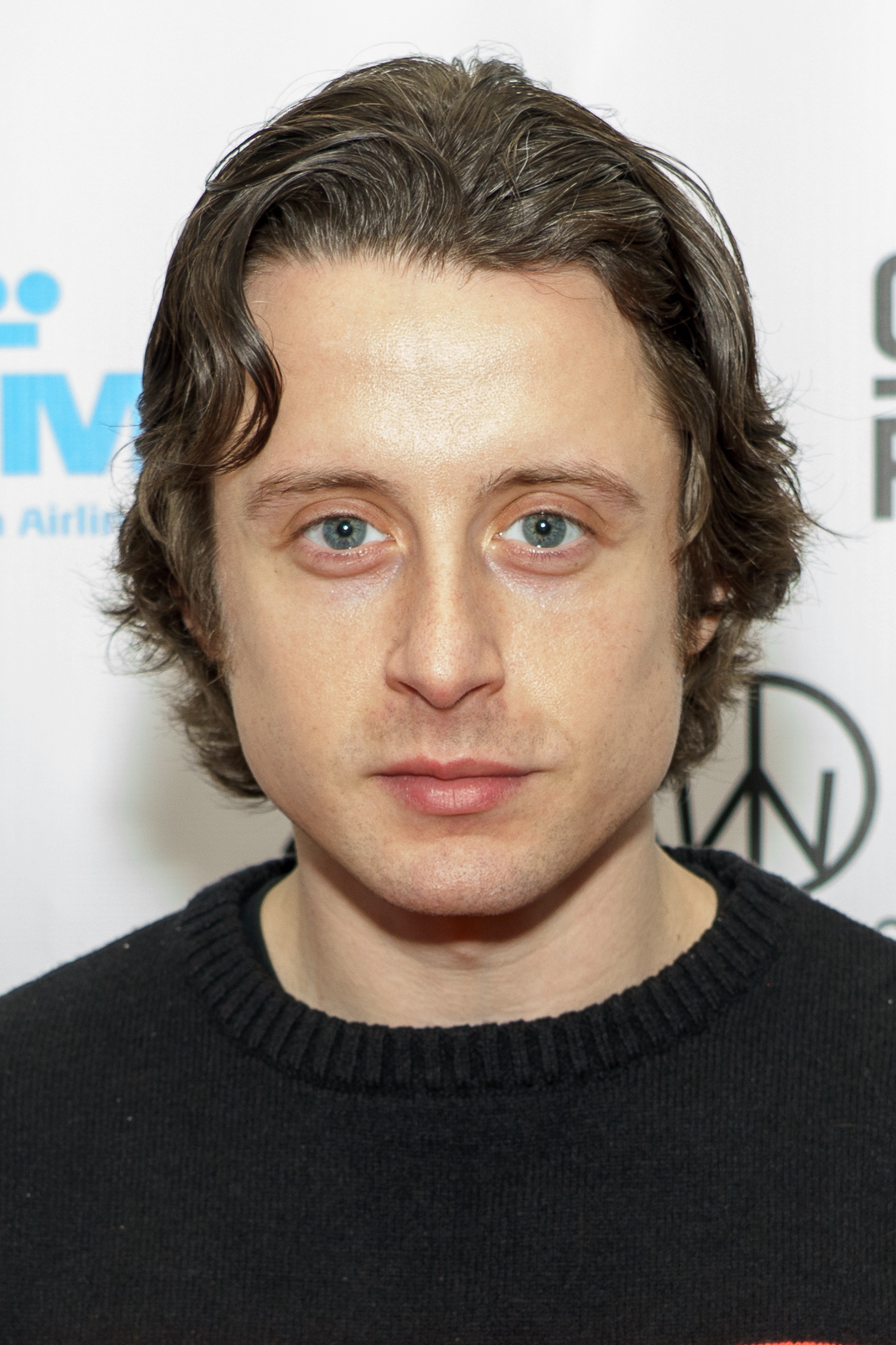
Rory Culkin

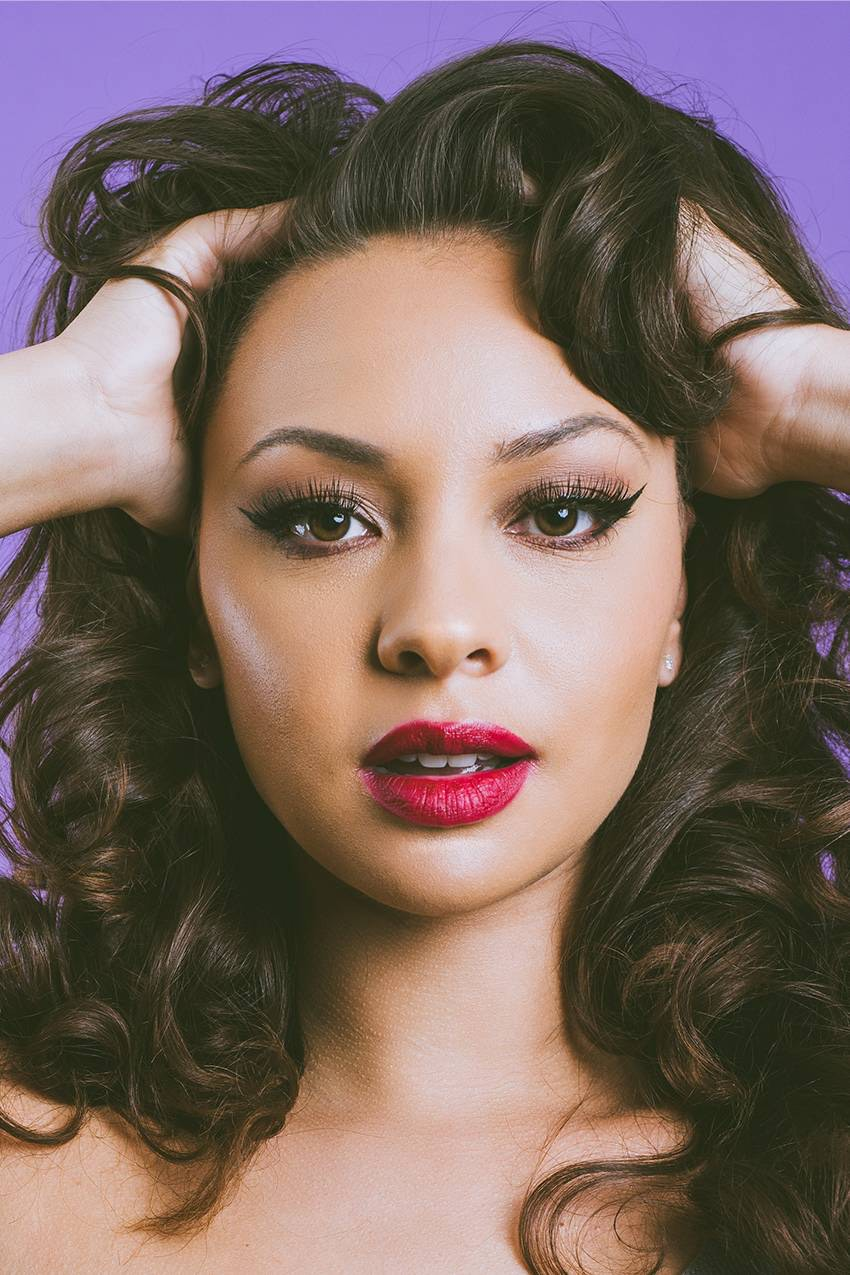
Jasmine Cephas Jones

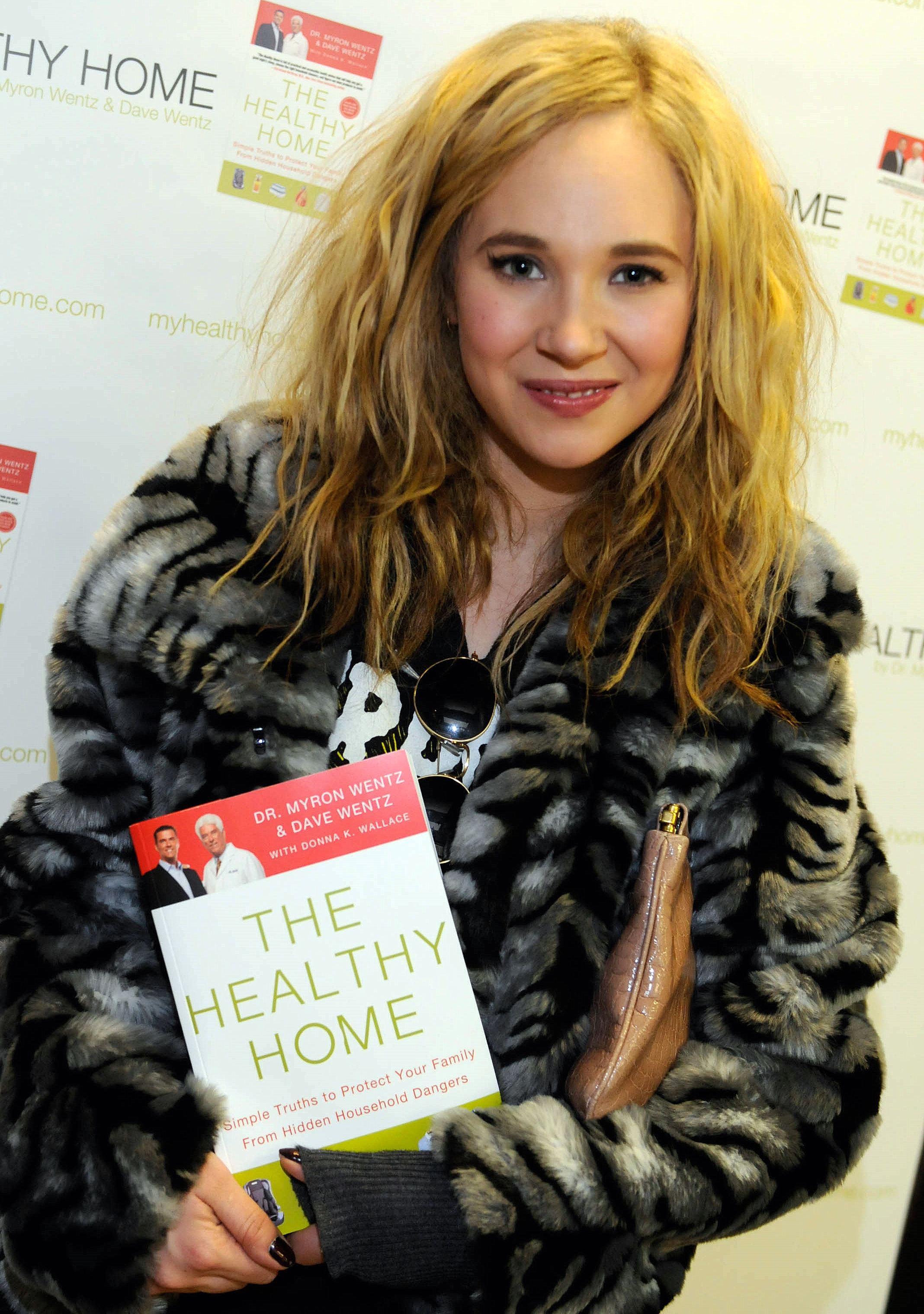
Juno Temple

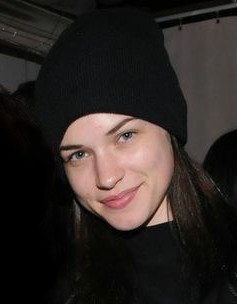
Alexis Knapp

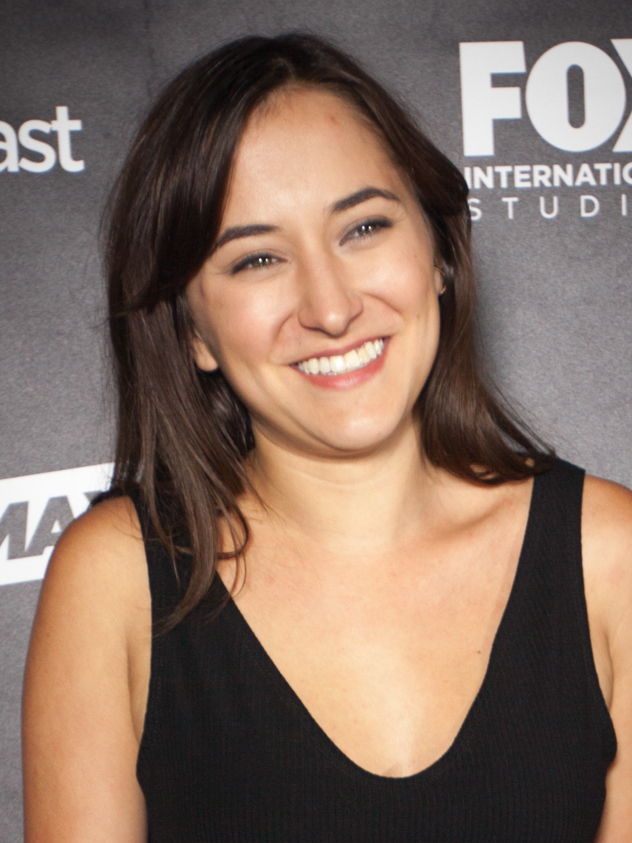
Zelda Williams

- July 1
  - Kent Bazemore, basketball player
  - Brittany Borman, Olympic discus and javelin thrower
- July 2
  - Emma Coronel Aispuro, beauty queen
  - Dev, pop singer/songwriter
  - Michael Dunigan, basketball player
  - Alex Morgan, soccer player
- July 3
  - Joey Janela, wrestler
  - Elle King, singer/songwriter and actress
- July 4
  - Jabari Blash, baseball player
  - Alyssa Miller, model
- July 5
  - Adam Cole, pro wrestler
  - LaMark Brown, football player
  - Sean O'Pry, model
- July 6 – Laith Ashley, model, actor, activist, singer/songwriter, and entertainer
- July 7
  - Sam Bell, politician
  - Skyler Bowlin, basketball player
  - Austin Kerr, bassist for Set It Off
- July 10
  - Scott Alexander, baseball player
  - Akeem Ayers, football player
- July 11
  - Big Swole, wrestler
  - Miel Bredouw, comedian, podcaster, and musician
  - Shareeka Epps, actress
  - David Henrie, actor and director
- July 12
  - Tyler Bowen, football coach
  - Hilary Knight, Olympic hockey player
- July 13 – Leon Bridges, singer/songwriter and record producer
- July 14
  - Andre Branch, football player
  - Rob Brantly, baseball player
  - Pedro De Abreu, Brazilian-born entrepreneur, educator, and author
  - Rolando McClain, football player
- July 15
  - Tristan Wilds, actor and singer
- July 16
  - Tony Bishop, American-born Panamanian basketball player
  - Carlito Olivero, singer
- July 18 – Derek Dietrich, baseball player
- July 19 – James Austin Johnson, comedian and impressionist
- July 21
  - Rory Culkin, actor
  - Chelsie Hightower, dancer and choreographer
  - Jasmine Cephas Jones, actress
  - Juno Temple, English-born actress
  - Narcissa Wright, video game speedrunner
- July 22
  - Keegan Allen, actor
  - Alex Andrade, politician
- July 23
  - Gibson Bardsley, soccer player
  - K. J. Wright, football player
  - Donald Young, tennis player
- July 24 – Jansen Allen, racquetball player
- July 25 – Andrew Caldwell, actor
- July 26 – Jonathan Dwyer, football player
- July 27 – Mike Brewster, football player
- July 28
  - Adrien Broner, boxer
  - Matt Brown, football player
  - Nick Jackson, pro wrestler
- July 29
  - Nick Afanasiev, Russian-born actor
  - Marlen Esparza, boxer
  - Jake Smollett, actor
- July 31
  - Brandon Adams, boxer
  - Brandon Burton, football player and coach
  - Alexis Knapp, actress and singer
  - Aljamain Sterling, mixed martial artist
  - Jessica Williams, actress
  - Zelda Williams, actress

=== August ===
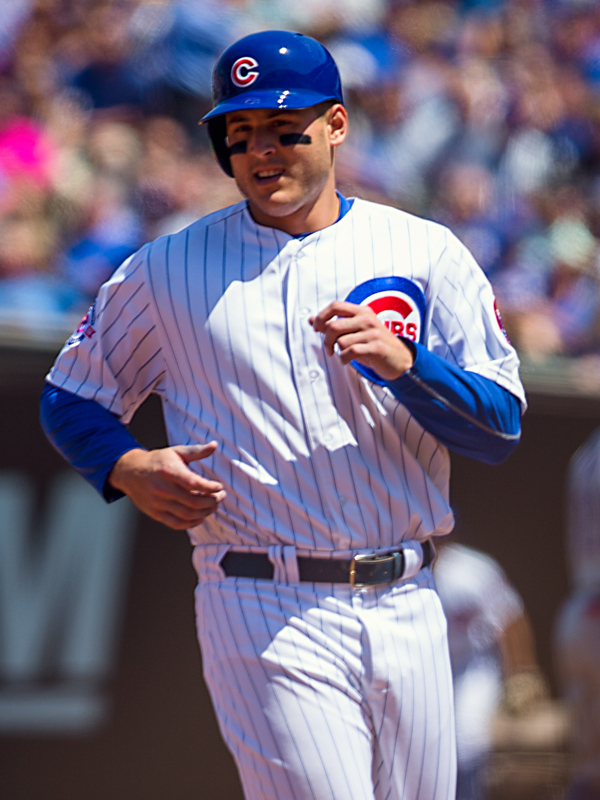
Anthony Rizzo

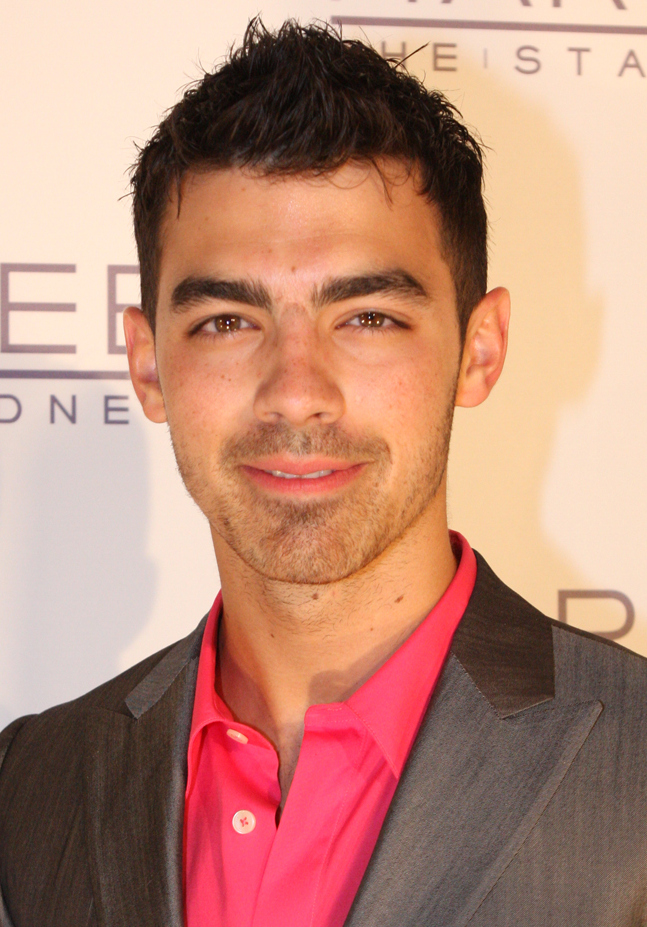
Joe Jonas

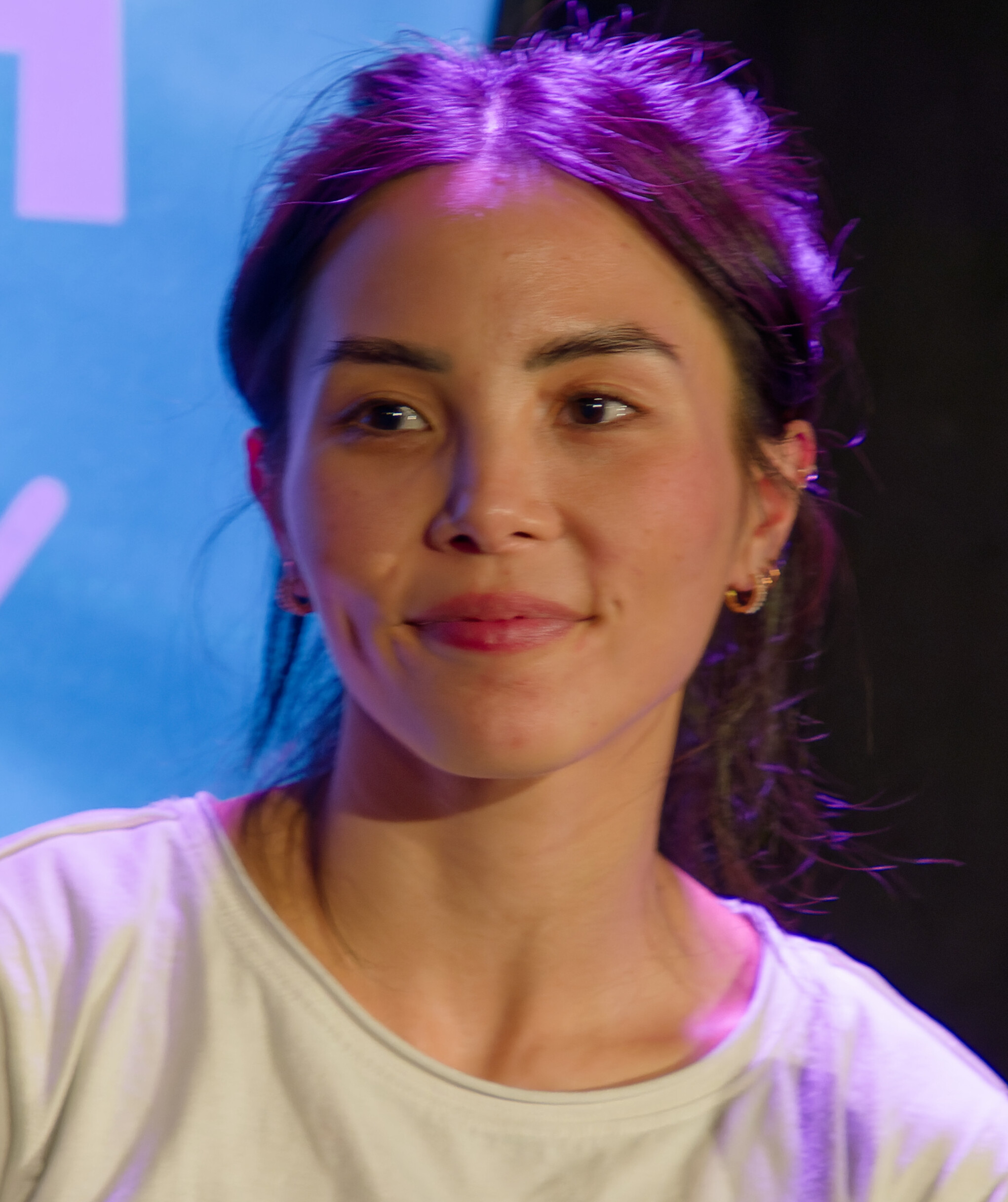
Anna Akana

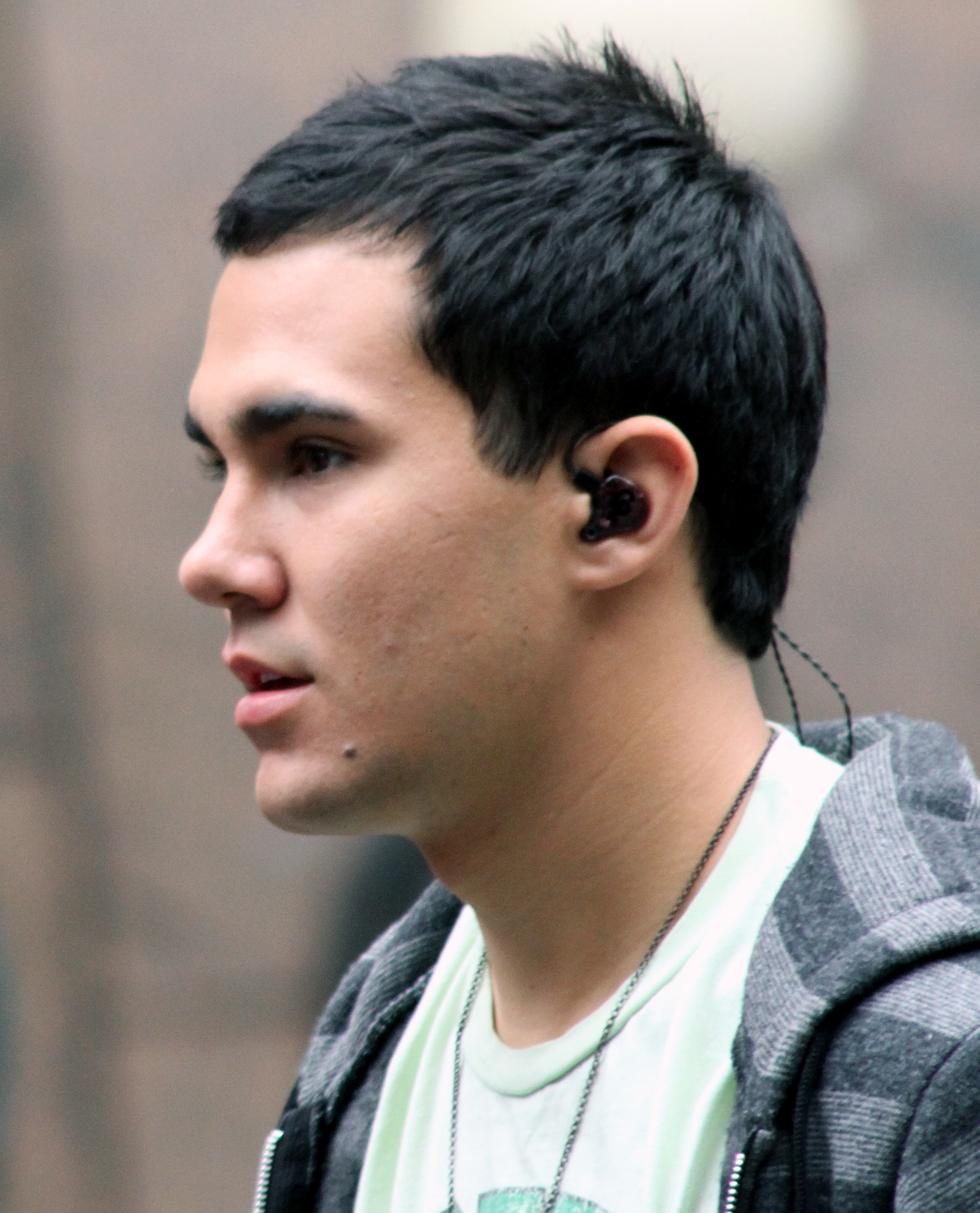
Carlos PenaVega

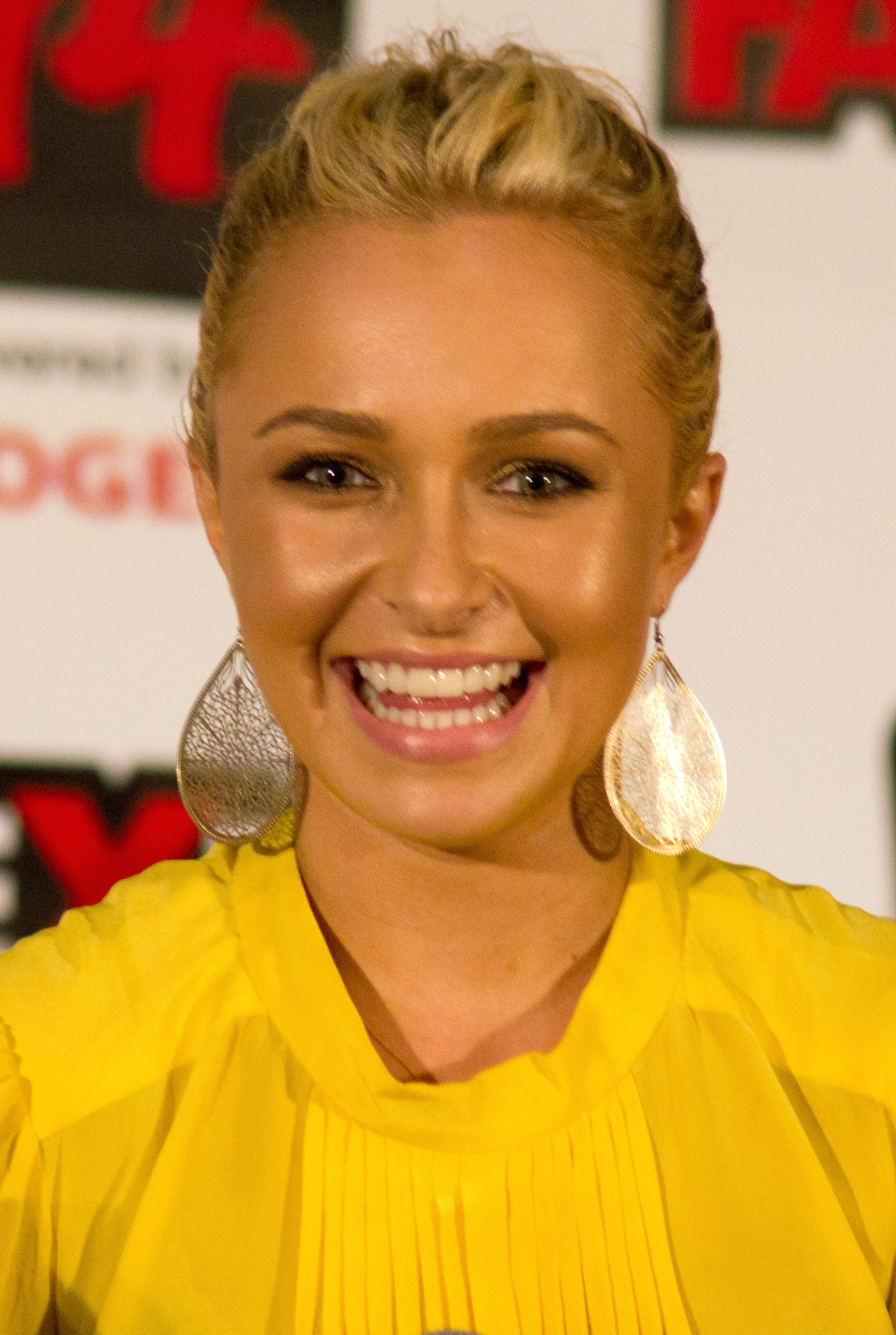
Hayden Panettiere

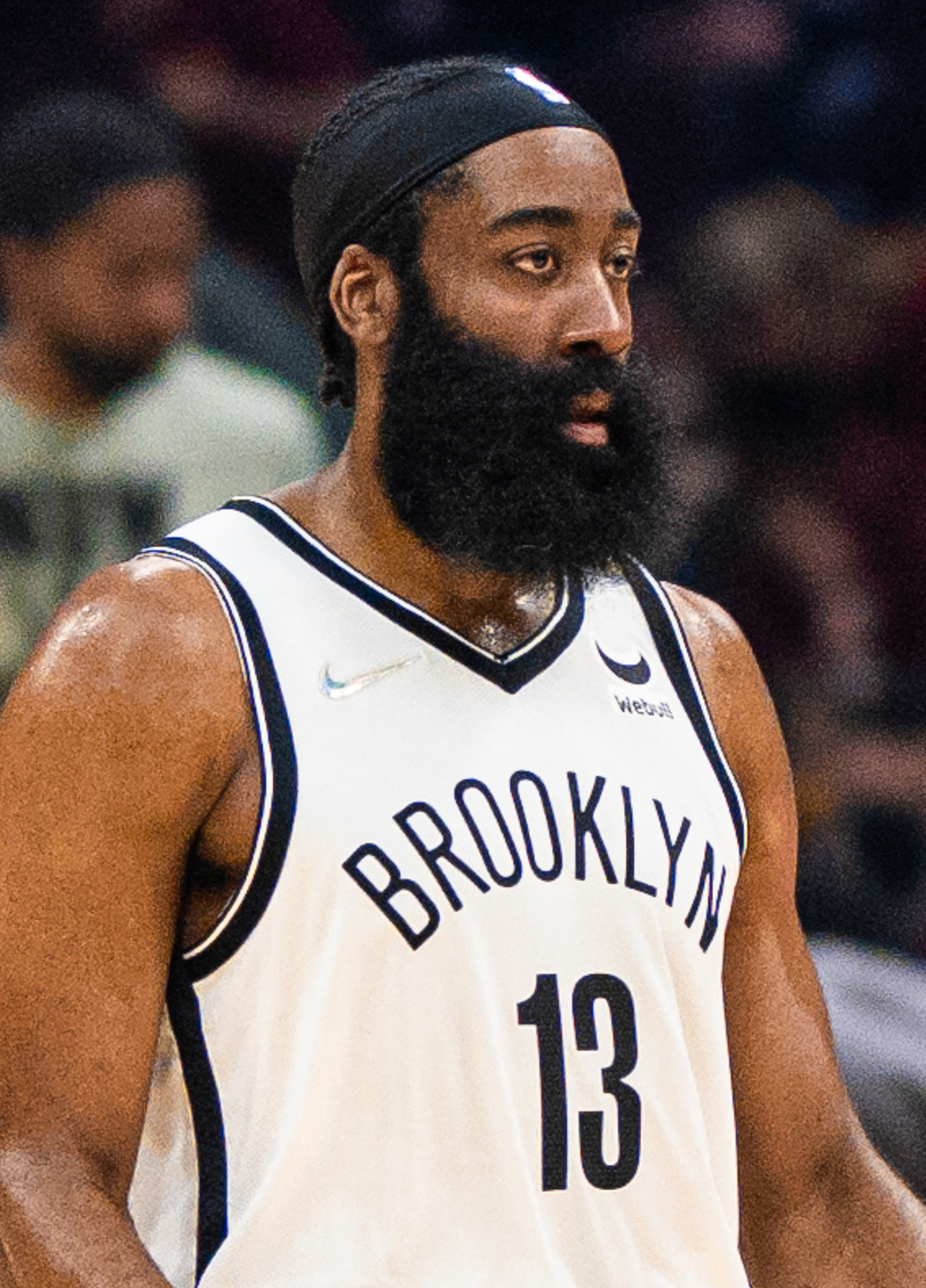
James Harden

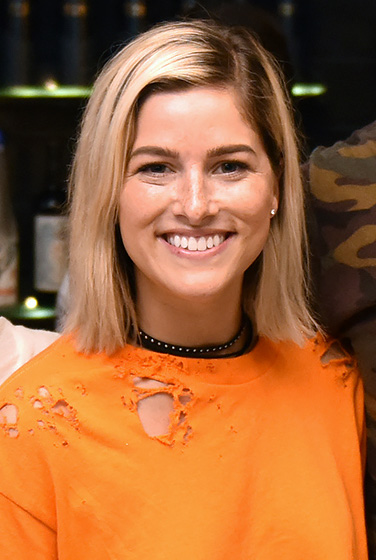
Cassadee Pope

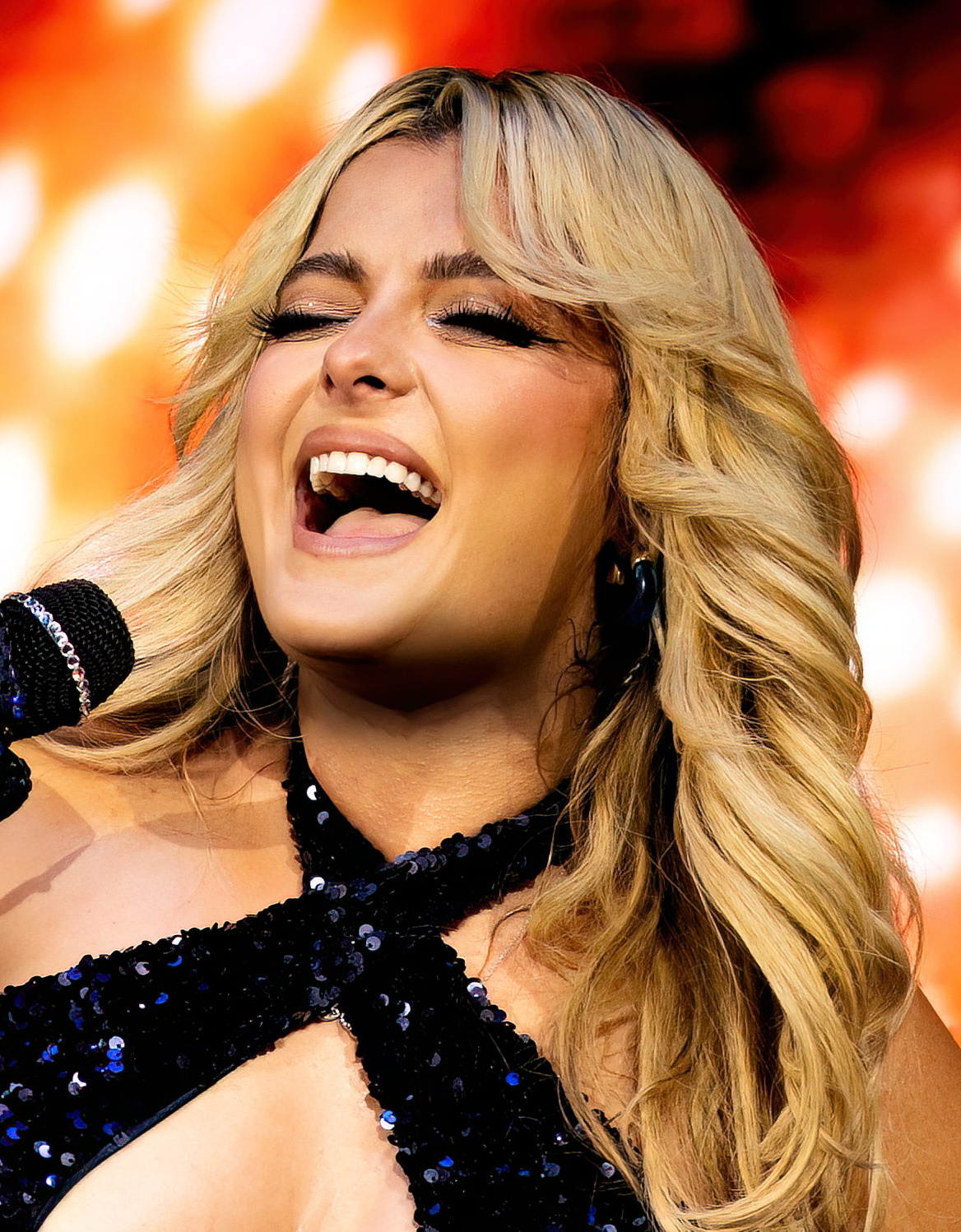
Bebe Rexha

- August 1
  - Landry Allbright, actress
  - Malcolm Armstead, American-born Kosovan-Romanian basketball player
  - Madison Bumgarner, baseball player
  - Tiffany Young, American-born Korean singer
- August 3
  - Isa Abdul-Quddus, football player
  - Josh Boyd, football player
- August 4
  - Anita Antoinette, raggae singer/songwriter and television personality
  - Jacob Blankenship, American-born Greek basketball player
  - Taylor Brown, basketball player
- August 5
  - Chasen Bradford, baseball player
  - Brinson, Christian rapper
  - Jessica Nigri, model and actress
- August 7 – DeMar DeRozan, basketball player
- August 8
  - Fatima Ali, Pakistani-born chef, restaurateur, and television personality (d. 2019)
  - Ken Baumann, actor and author
  - Brandon Bing, football player
  - Anthony Rizzo, baseball player
- August 9
  - Sam Adonis, wrestler
  - Dustin Antolin, baseball player
  - Meredith Deane, actress
  - Jason Heyward, baseball player
  - Paige Spara, actress
- August 10
  - Bad Luck Brian, internet personality
  - Jon Baldwin, football player
  - Alycia Bellamy, singer, actress, and muse
  - Elli Burris, soccer player
- August 11
  - Monique Burkland, Paralympic volleyball player
  - Alexis Tipton, voice actress
- August 12 – Scott Bamforth, basketball player
- August 13 – Forrest Bennett, politician
- August 14 – Brandon Brown, basketball player
- August 15
  - Paul Bamba, boxer (d. 2024)
  - Joe Jonas, musician, actor, singer, and member of the Jonas Brothers
  - Carlos PenaVega, actor, dancer, and singer
- August 16
  - Cedric Alexander, wrestler
  - Freddie Gray, African-American man killed by police
- August 17 – Mitchell Tenpenny, country singer/songwriter
- August 18
  - Anna Akana, YouTuber, actress, filmmaker, author and comedian
  - Amelia Brodka, Polish-born skateboarder, coach, and president of Exposure Skate Organization
  - LaRon Byrd, football player
- August 19
  - Brandon Brooks, football player
  - Romeo Miller, rapper, actor, entrepreneur and model
  - Julianna Peña, mixed martial artist
- August 20
  - Aalias, music producer and musician
  - Kirko Bangz, rapper
- August 21
  - Ehire Adrianza, Venezuelan-born baseball player
  - Hayden Panettiere, actress, singer and model (d. 2026)
- August 22 – Bobby Bollier, swimmer
- August 23
  - Trevor Bryan, boxer
  - Trixie Mattel, drag performer, television personality, and singer/songwriter
- August 24
  - J. C. Banks, soccer player
  - Josh Bynes, football player
- August 25
  - Brent Antonello, actor
  - Ryan Benoit, mixed martial artist
- August 26 – James Harden, basketball player
- August 27 – Juliana Cannarozzo, figure skater
- August 28
  - Matt Andriese, baseball player
  - Cassadee Pope, singer/songwriter and lead singer of Hey Monday
- August 30
  - Bebe Rexha, pop singer, rapper, and songwriter
  - Billy Burns, baseball player
  - Westside Boogie, rapper
- August 31
  - Trent Blank, baseball player
  - Nate Brakeley, rugby player
  - Dezmon Briscoe, football player

=== September ===
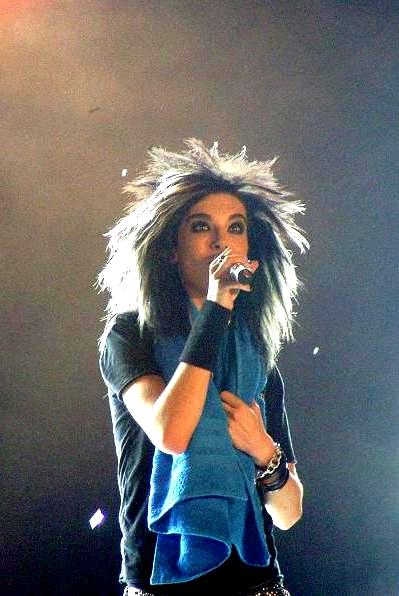
Bill Kaulitz

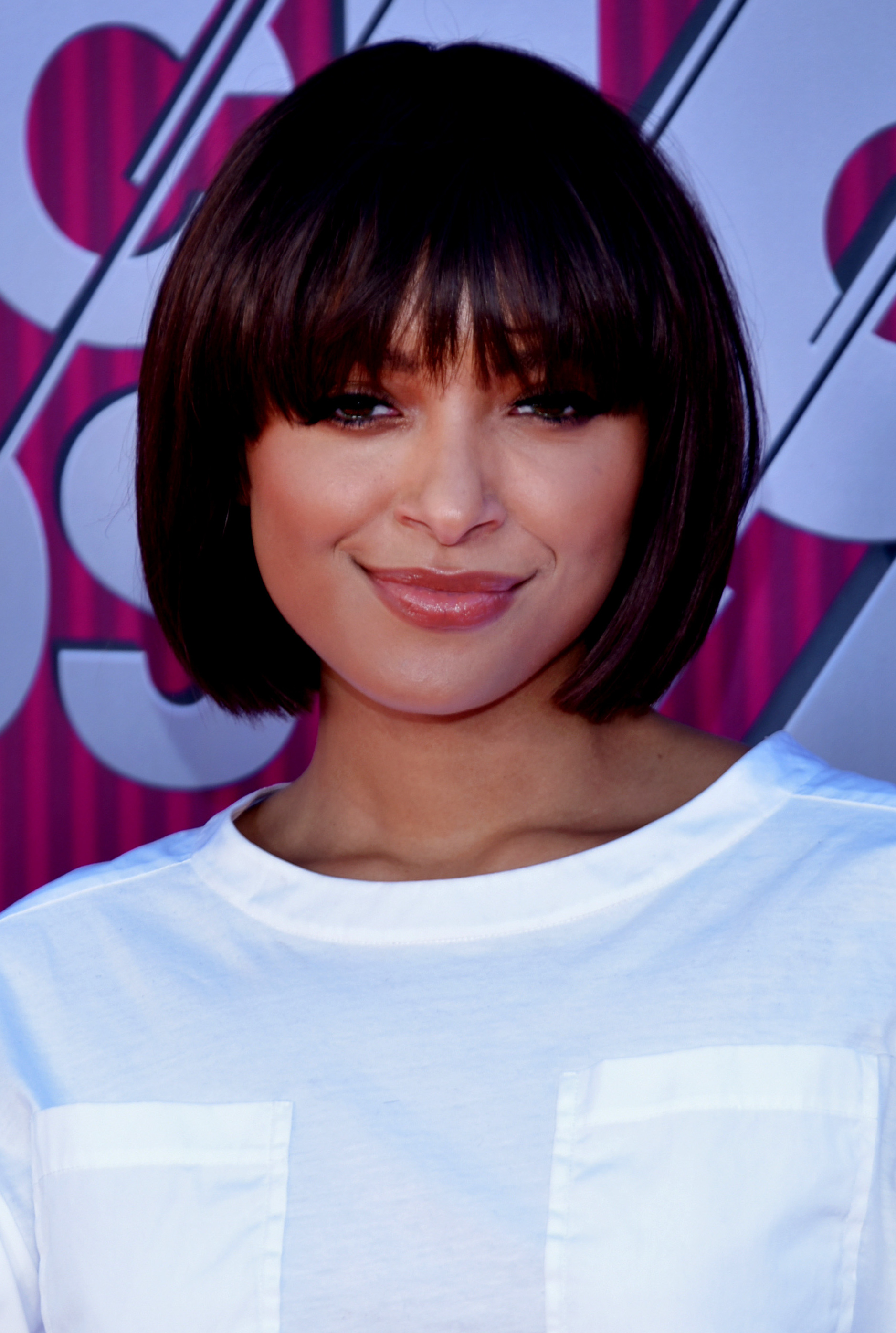
Kat Graham

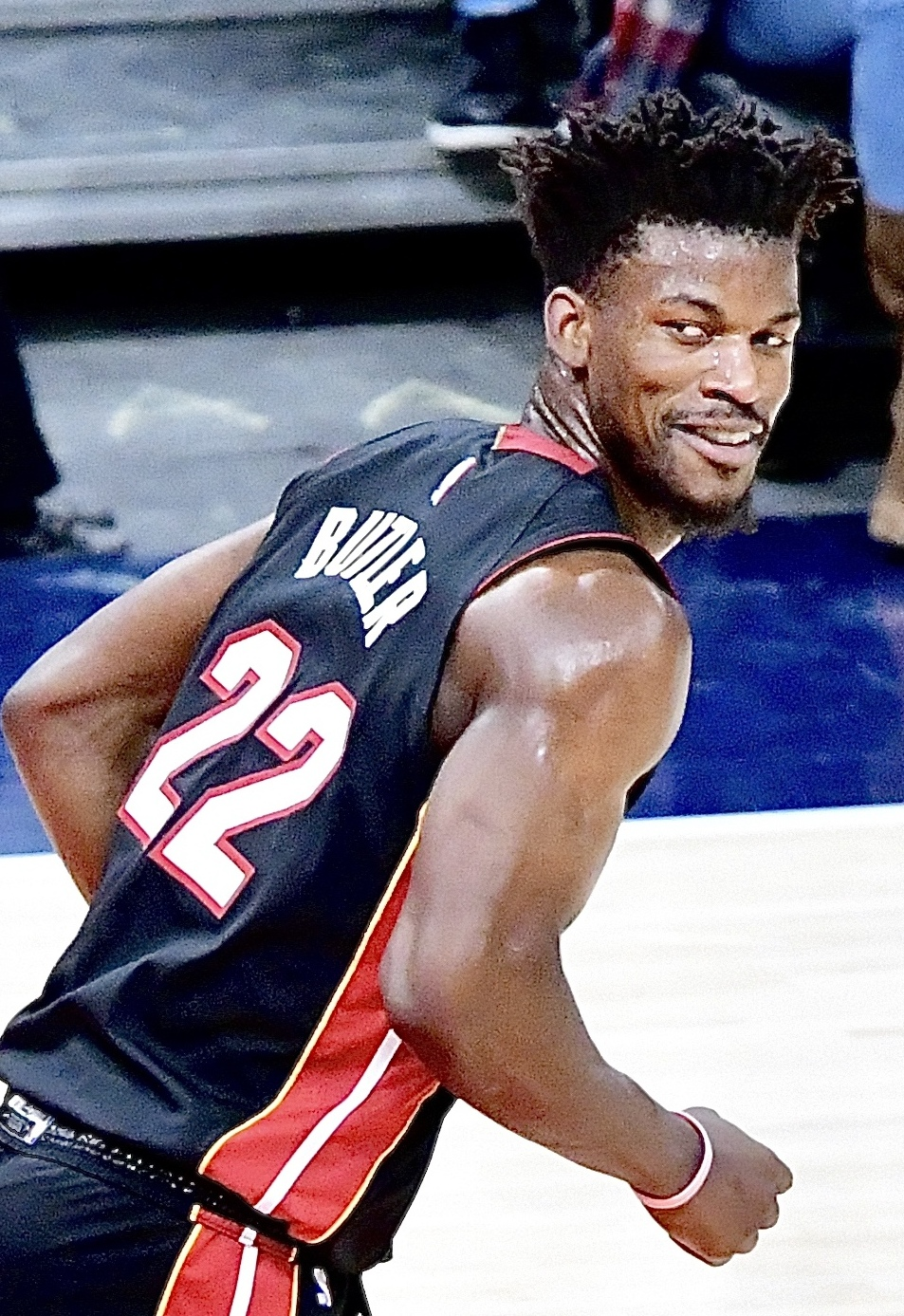
Jimmy Butler

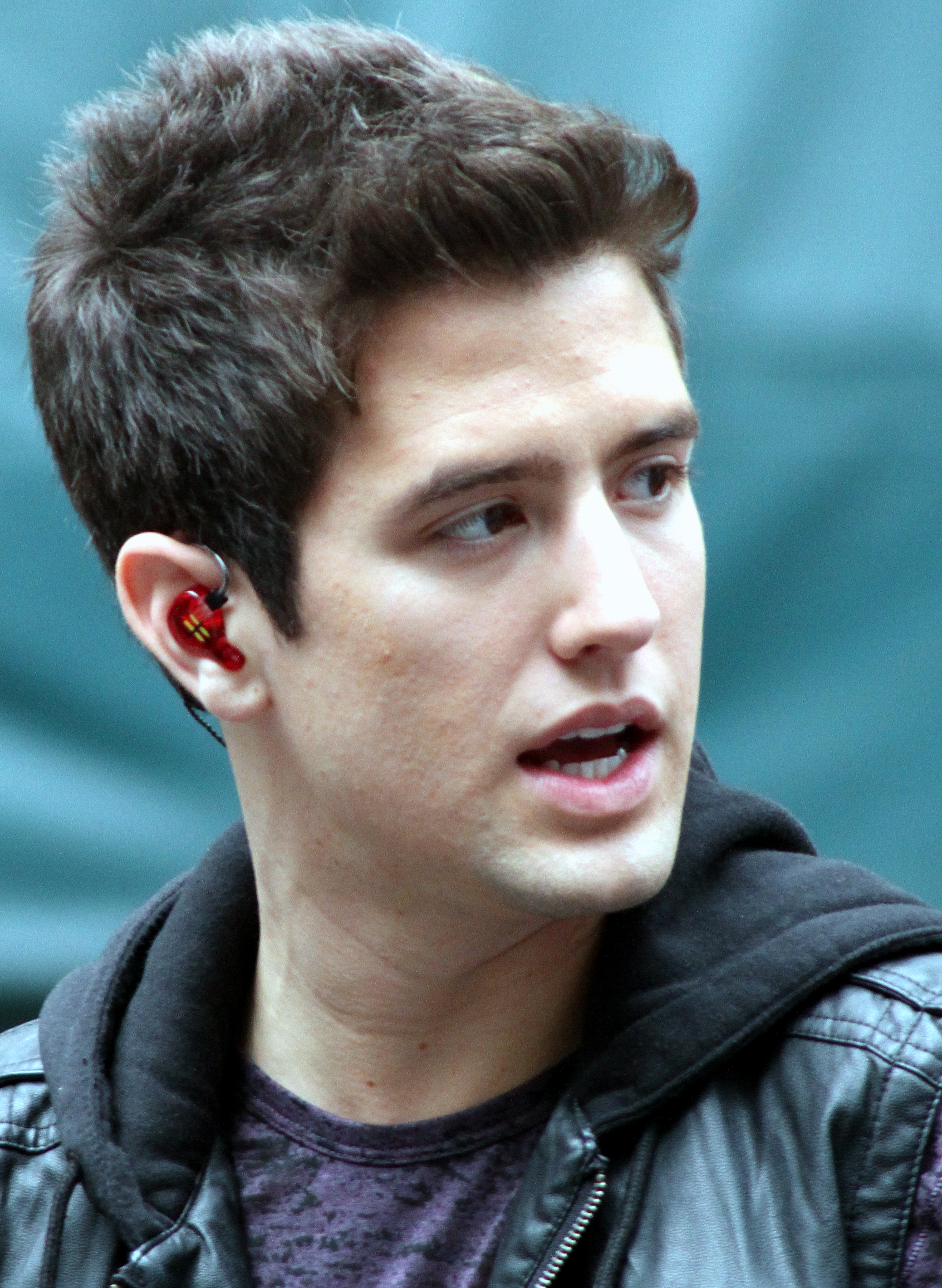
Logan Henderson

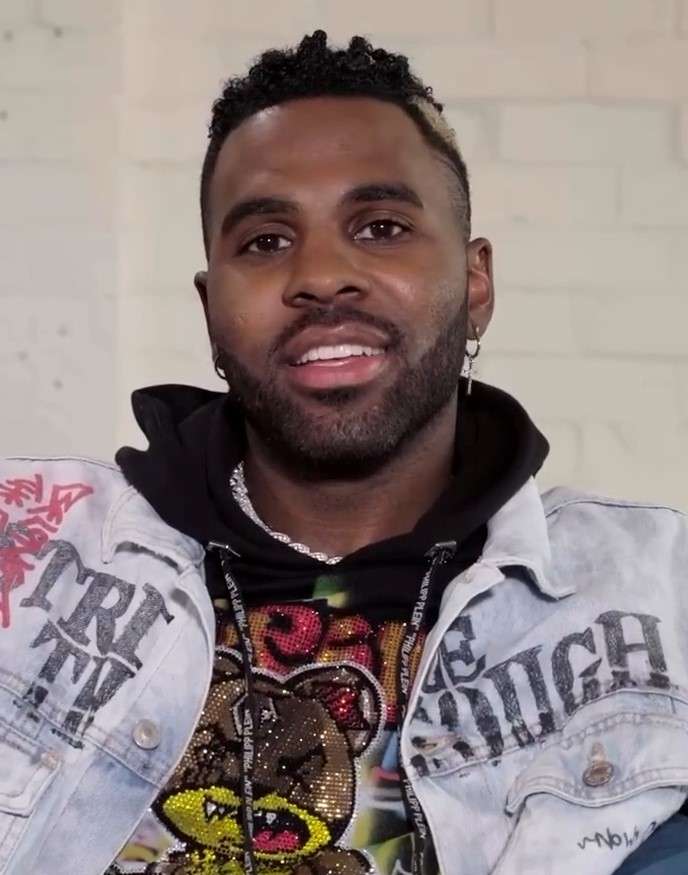
Jason Derulo

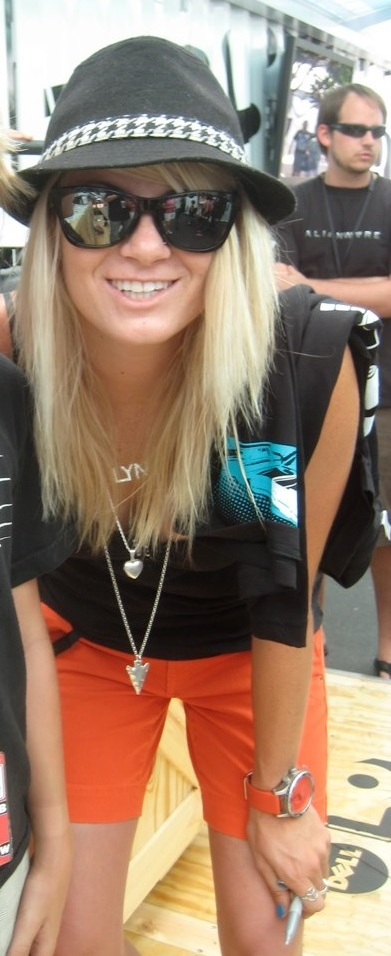
Lyn-Z Adams Hawkins

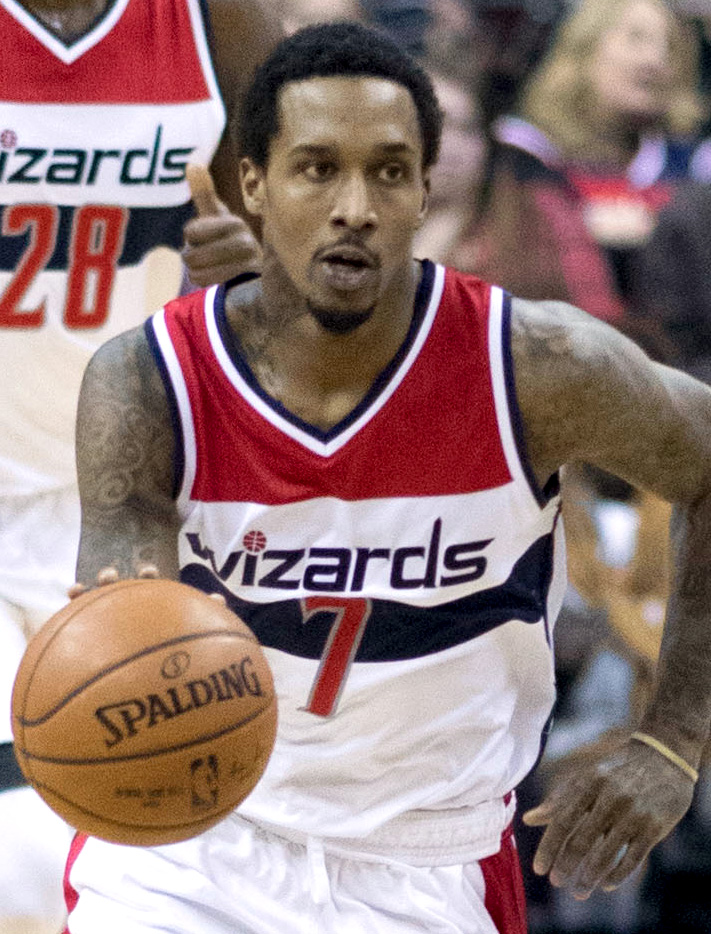
Brandon Jennings

- September 1 – Bill Kaulitz, German-born singer/songwriter and frontman for Tokio Hotel
- September 2 – Bianca Butler, pair figure skater
- September 4 – Nigel Bradham, football player
- September 5 – Kat Graham, Swiss-born actress, singer, dancer, and model
- September 6
  - Jeff Adams, football player
  - Kaelin Burnett, football player
- September 7
  - Loren Allred, singer/songwriter and actress
  - Tim Benford, football player
  - Robert Blanton, football player
  - Jonathan Majors, actor
- September 8
  - Salvijus Bercys, Lithuanian-born chess grandmaster
  - Armon Binns, football player
  - Avicii, Swedish DJ, remixer and music producer.
- September 9
  - Damario Ambrose, football player
  - Sean Malto, skateboarder
- September 10 – Sanjaya Malakar, singer
- September 11
  - Michele Aquino, Italian-born soccer player
  - Angela Bys, volleyball player
  - Karima Christmas-Kelly, basketball player and coach
- September 12
  - Ron Anderson, basketball player
  - Kyle Barone, basketball player
  - Megan Blunk, wheelchair basketball player
  - Justin Boston, stock car racing driver
  - Freddie Freeman, baseball player
  - Andrew Luck, football player
- September 14
  - Jimmy Butler, basketball player
  - Tony Finau, golfer
  - Logan Henderson, actor, dancer, singer, and member of Big Time Rush
  - Jesse James, actor
  - Jonathon Simmons, basketball player
- September 15 – BbyMutha, rapper
- September 17
  - Tim Abromaitis, basketball player
  - Danielle Brooks, actress and singer
- September 19
  - Tyreke Evans, basketball player
  - George Springer, baseball player
- September 20 – Tiffany Hayes, basketball player
- September 21
  - Phil Bates, football player
  - Brianna Buentello, politician
  - Jason Derulo, singer
  - Lyn-Z Adams Hawkins, skateboarder
  - Dina Shihabi, Saudi Arabian-born actress
- September 22
  - Corey Anderson, mixed martial artist
  - Jon Bass, actor
- September 23
  - Joe Brady, football coach
  - Brandon Jennings, basketball player
  - Kevin Norwood, football player
- September 24 – Jake Buchanan, baseball player
- September 27
  - Derek Buttles, football player
  - Landon Tewers, singer and frontman for The Plot in You
- September 29 – Ian Crawford, musician

=== October ===
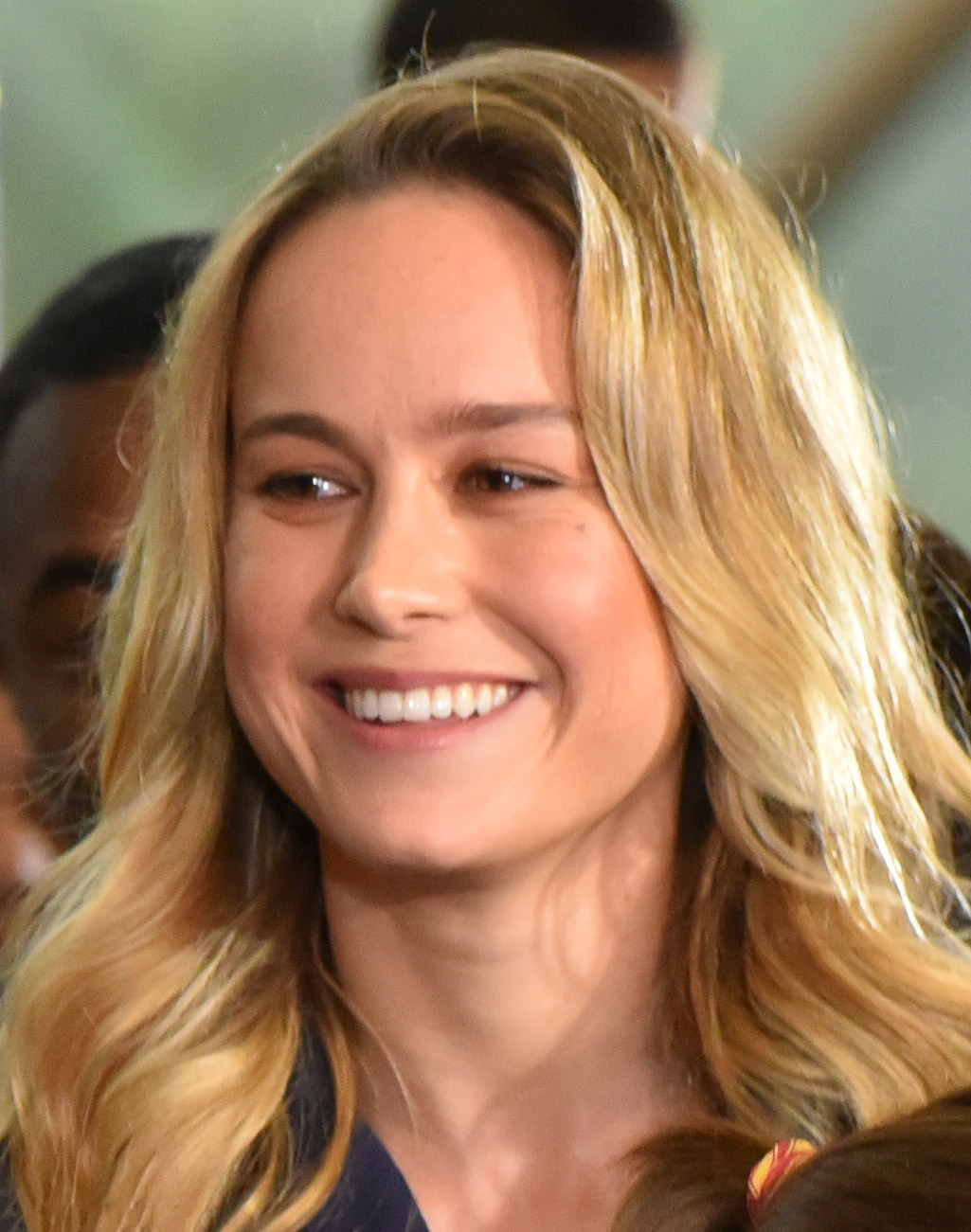
Brie Larson

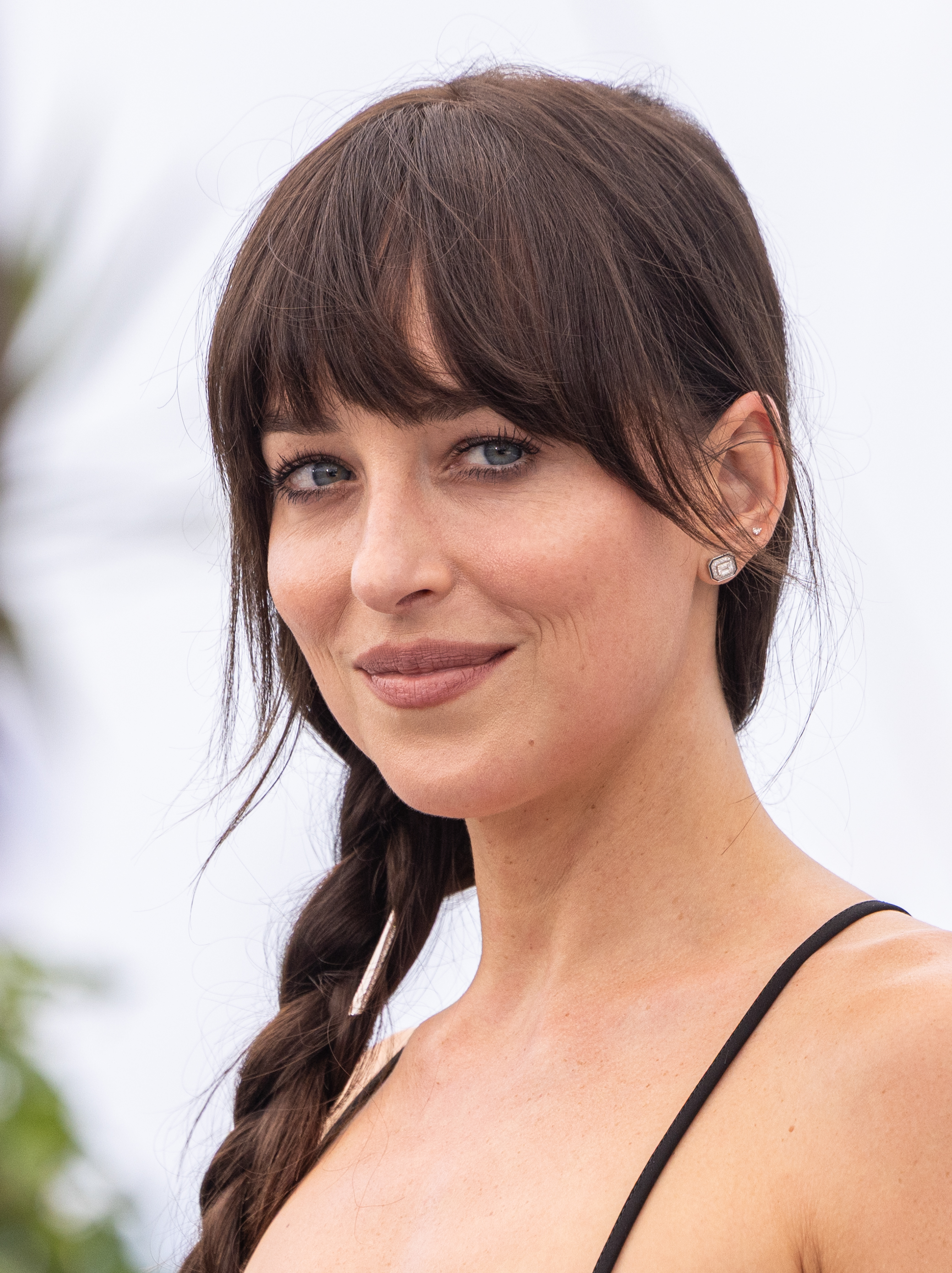
Dakota Johnson

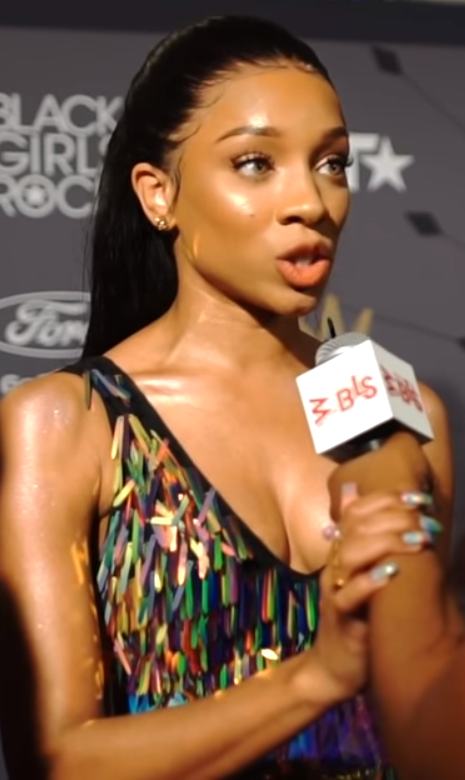
Lil Mama

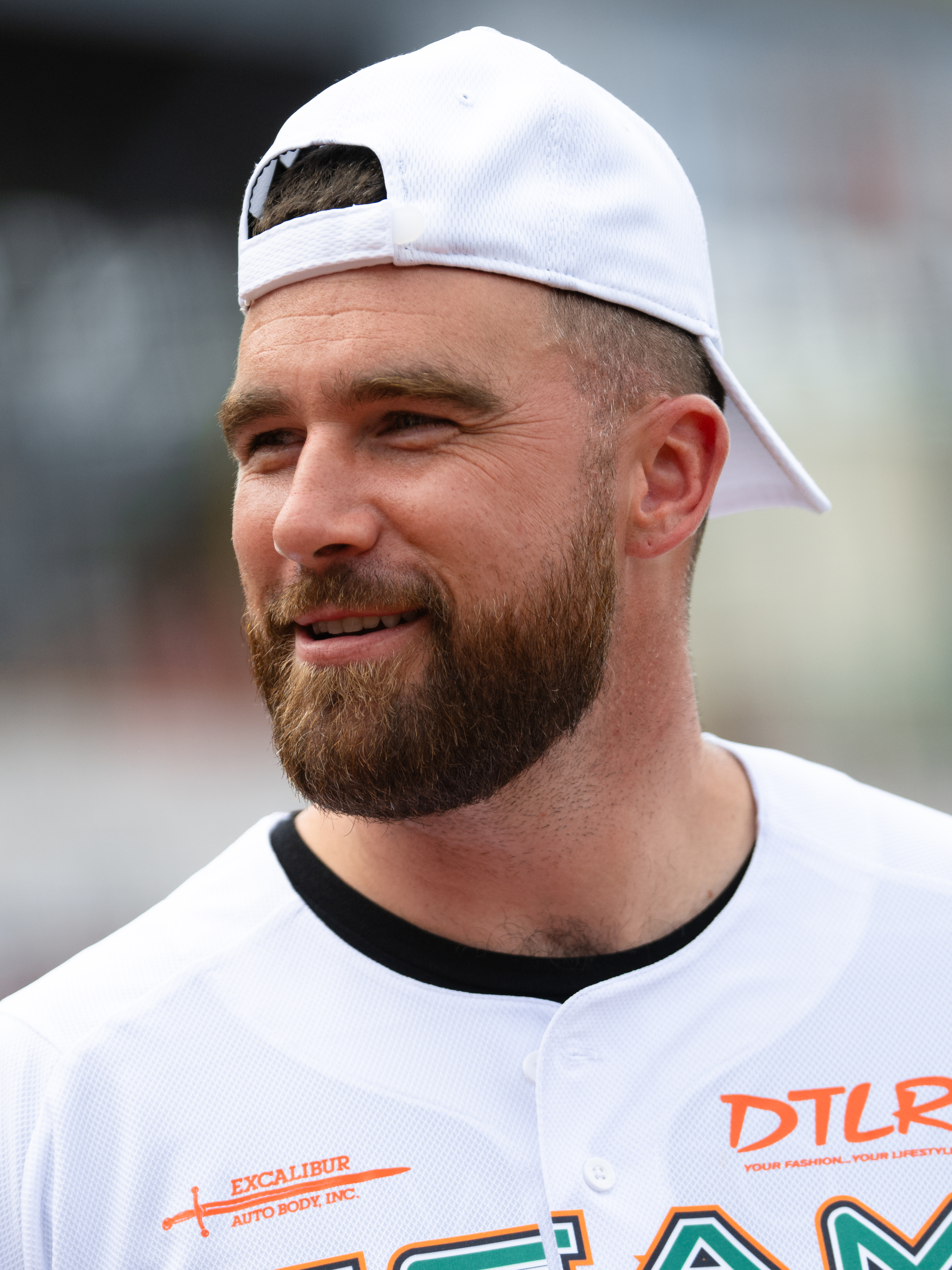
Travis Kelce

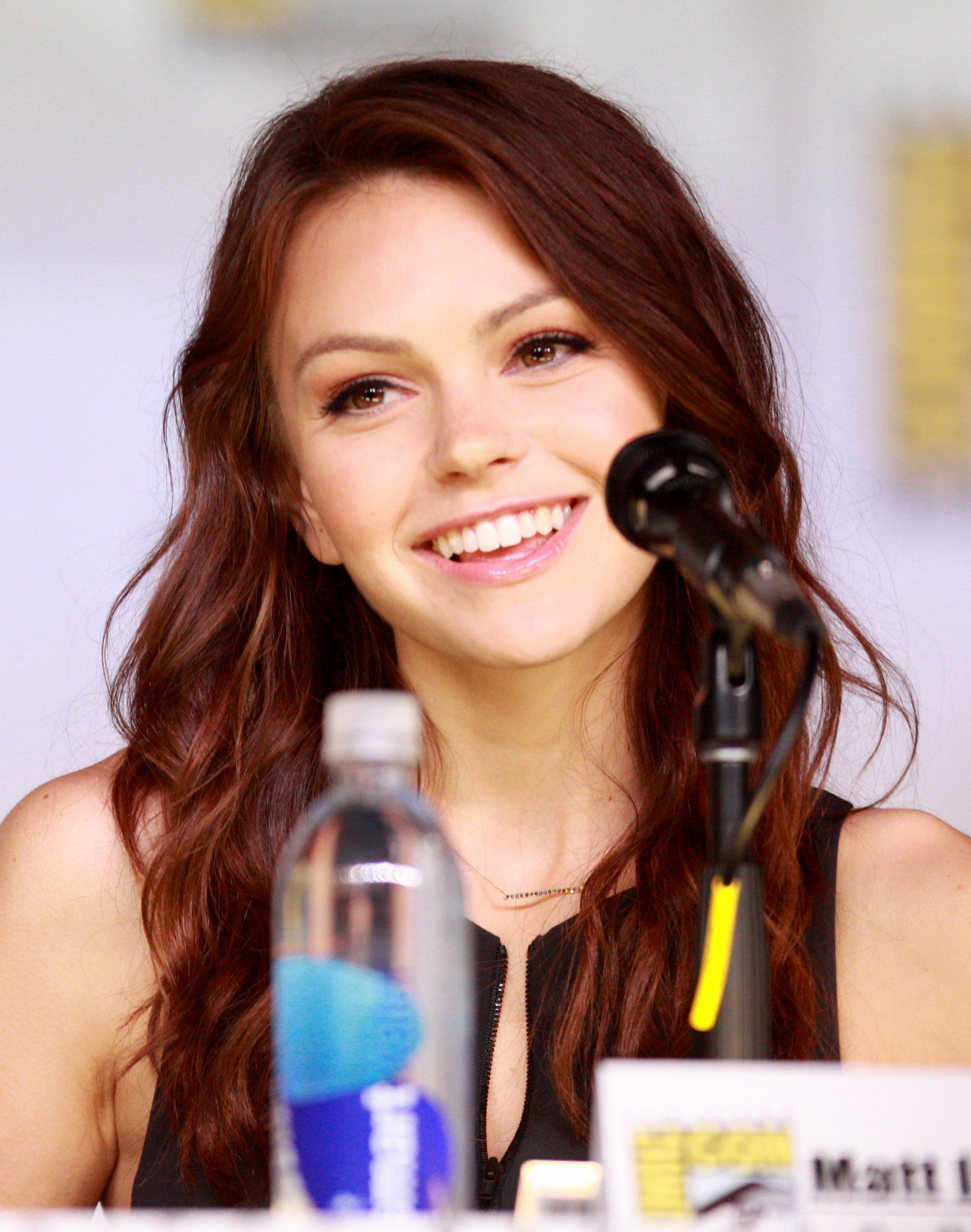
Aimee Teegarden

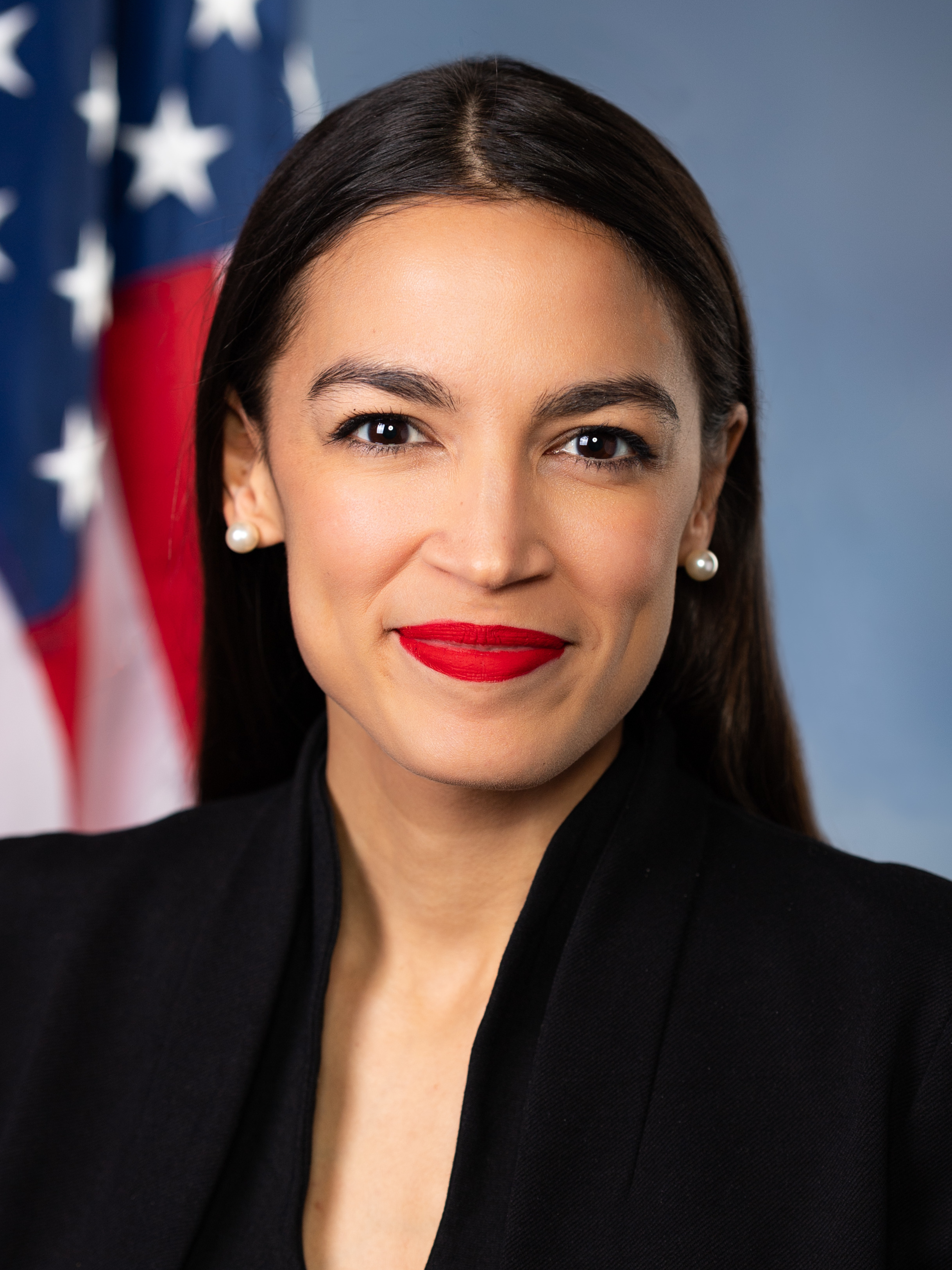
Alexandria Ocasio-Cortez

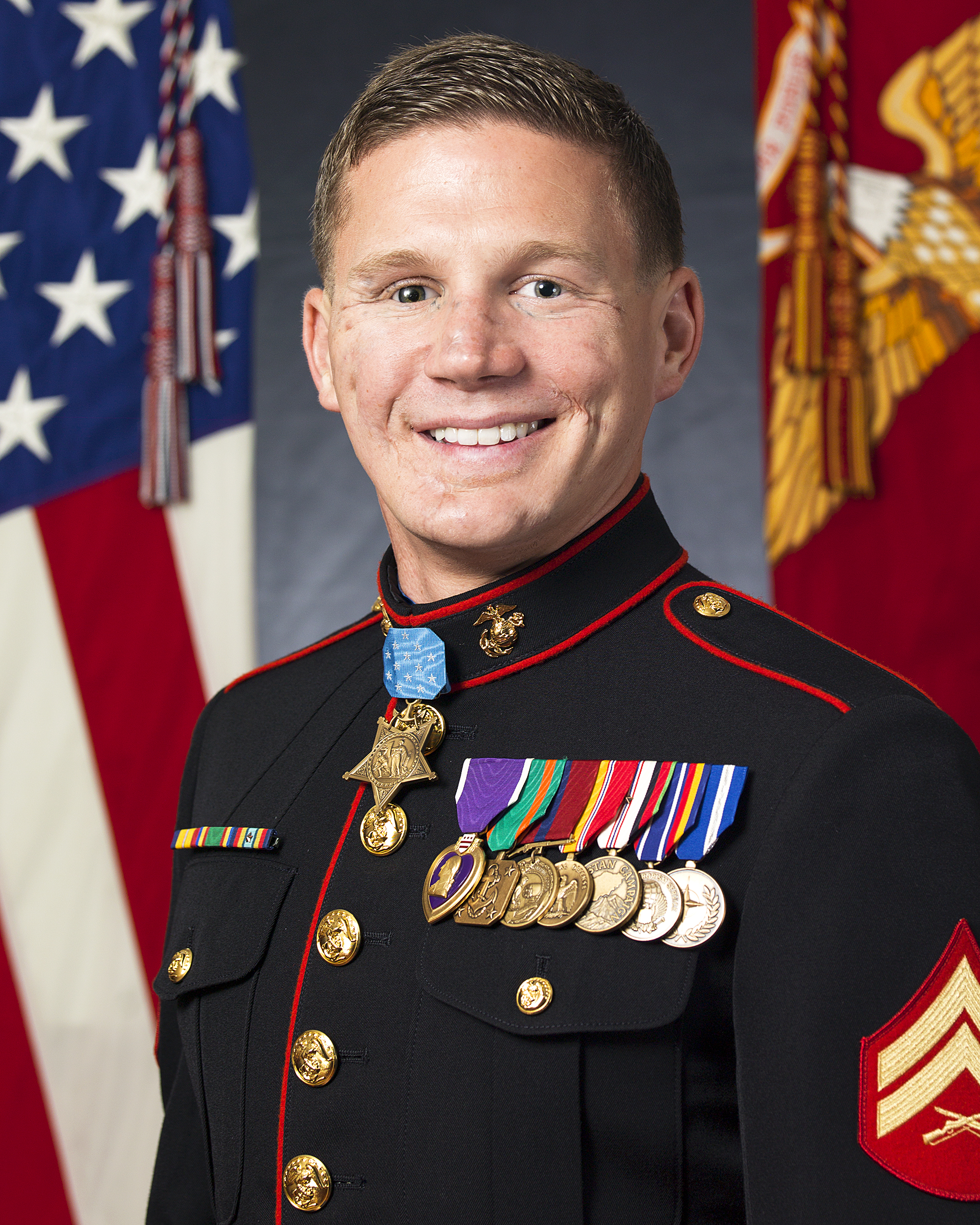
Kyle Carpenter

- October 1
  - Lauren Albanese. tennis player
  - Brie Larson, actress and singer
- October 3
  - Akeem Auguste, football player
  - Chase Austin, racing driver
  - Johnthan Banks, football player
  - Joplo Bartu, football player
- October 4
  - Audra the Rapper, rapper, songwriter, and television personality
  - Carlon Brown, basketball player
  - Austin Davis, politician, 35th Lieutenant Governor of Pennsylvania
  - Dakota Johnson, actress
  - Lil Mama, rapper
  - Kimmie Meissner, figure skater
  - Rich Homie Quan, rapper
  - Supa Bwe, hip hop recording artist, producer, and audio engineer
- October 5
  - Jackson Anderson, football player
  - Jerime Anderson, basketball player
  - Travis Kelce, football player
- October 6 – Peter Badovinac, football coach
- October 10
  - Austin Block, ice hockey player
  - Joey Bradford, BMX racer
  - Aimee Teegarden, actress
- October 11
  - Brian Arnfelt, football player and lawyer
  - Michelle Wie, golfer
- October 12
  - Ben Bass, football player
  - Beef, rapper
  - Dee Bost, American-born Bulgarian basketball player
  - DeAndre Brown, football player
- October 13
  - Brace Belden, podcaster and union activist
  - Alexandria Ocasio-Cortez, politician
  - Skyler Page, animator and voice actor
- October 15
  - Callie Brownson, football player and coach
  - Blaine Gabbert, football player
  - Tucker Reed, blogger, author, journalist, and feminist activist
- October 16 – Jack Salvatore Jr., production assistant and actor
- October 17 – Kyle Carpenter, marine, Afghan War veteran, and Medal of Honor Recipient
- October 18
  - Carson Blair, baseball player
  - Chad Bumphis, football player and coach
  - Matthew Centrowitz Jr., Olympic middle-distance runner
  - Laci Green, internet feminist
- October 19
  - David Bingham, soccer player
  - Suleiman Braimoh, Nigerian-born basketball player
- October 21
  - Danny Barnes, baseball player
  - Damien Berry, football player
- October 22
  - Ross Barkan, journalist, novelist, columnist, and essayist
  - Marco Restrepo, musician
  - Muhammad Wilkerson, football player
- October 23
  - Kye Allums, basketball player
  - Zach Brown, football player
- October 24
  - Ken Brown, basketball player
  - T'erea Brown, track and field athlete
  - Will Bruin, soccer player
  - Eric Hosmer, baseball player
- October 25
  - Delvin Breaux, American-born Canadian football player
  - Amber English, Olympic skeet shooter
  - Marina Keegan, author and journalist
- October 27
  - Mark Barron, football player
  - Mia Kilburg, Olympic speed skater
- October 30
  - Seth Adkins, actor
  - Nastia Liukin, Russian-born Olympic artistic gymnast
- October 31
  - Gerald Bowman, football player
  - Scott McGough, baseball player

=== November ===
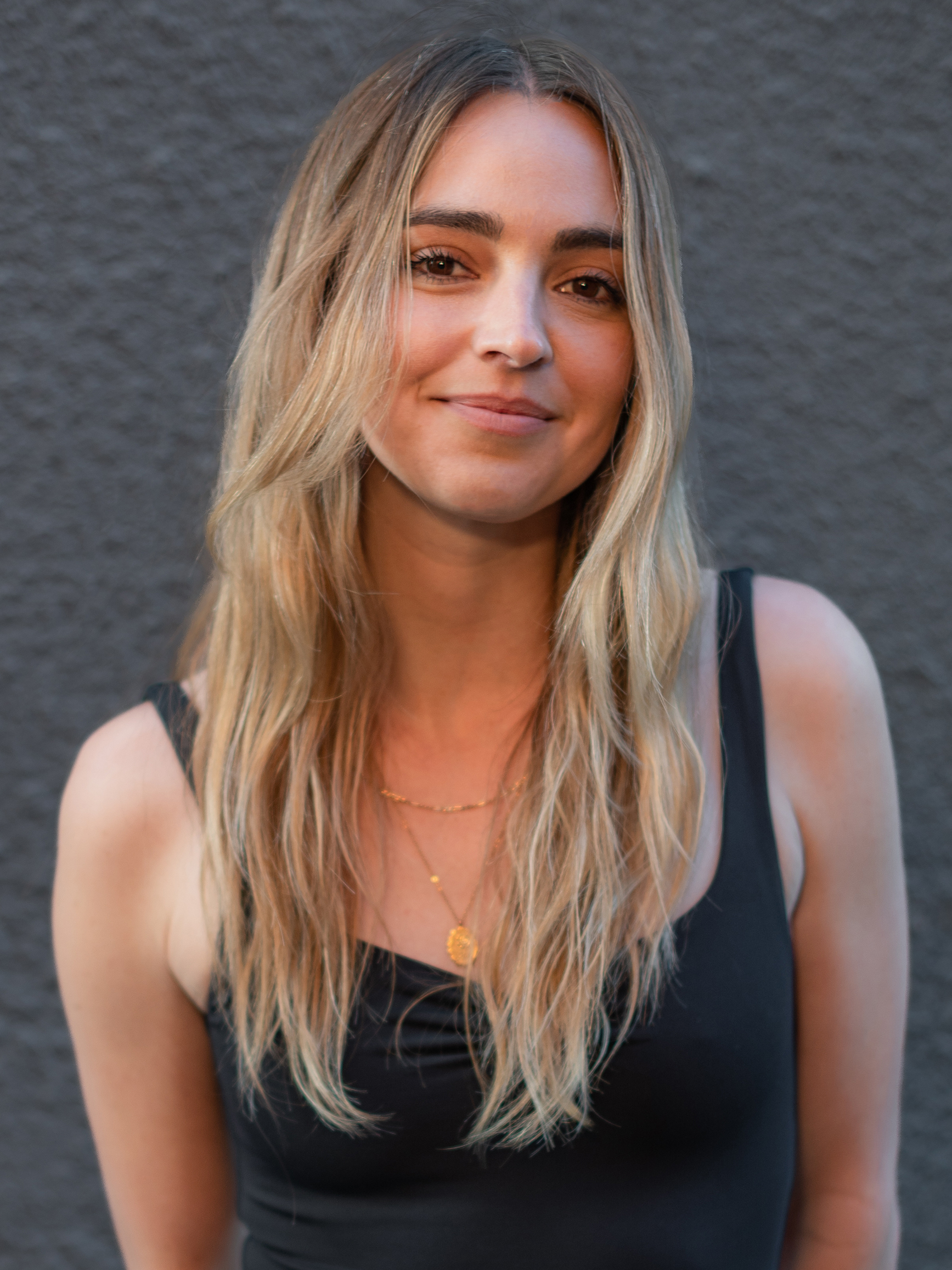
Katelyn Tarver

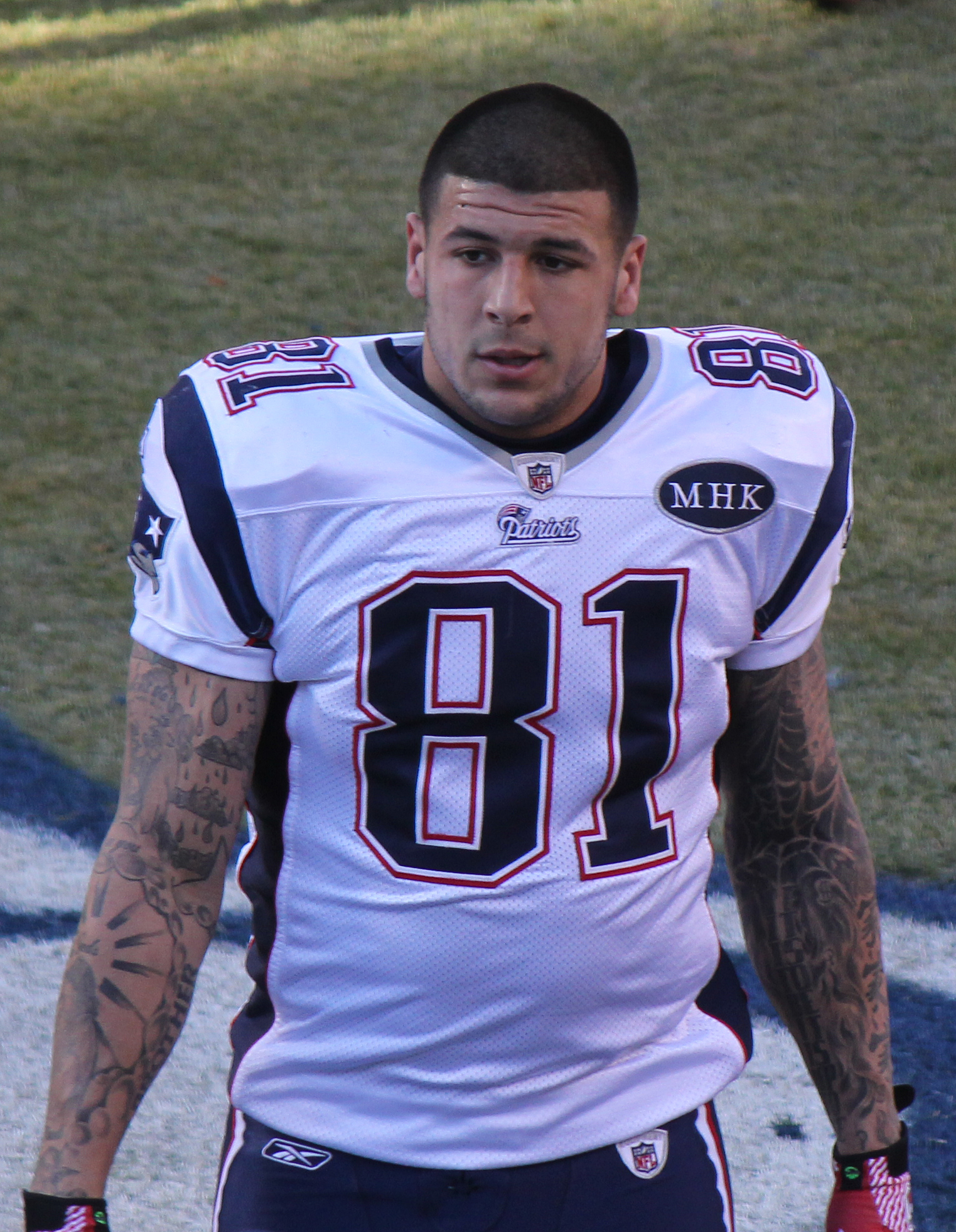
Aaron Hernandez

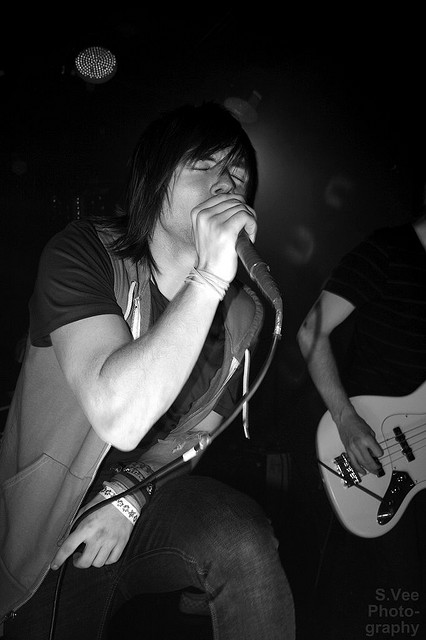
Jordan Mark Witzigreuter

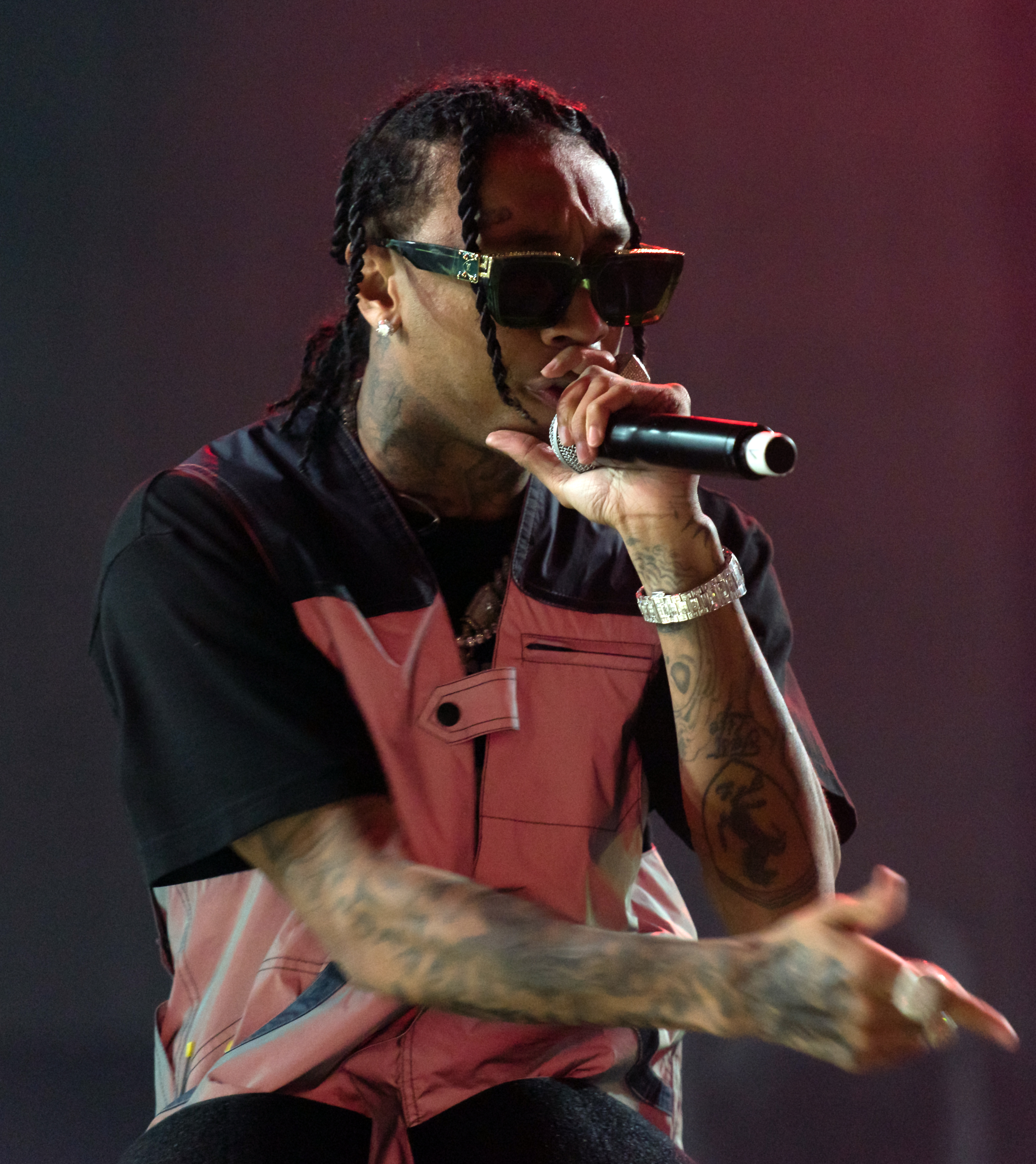
Tyga

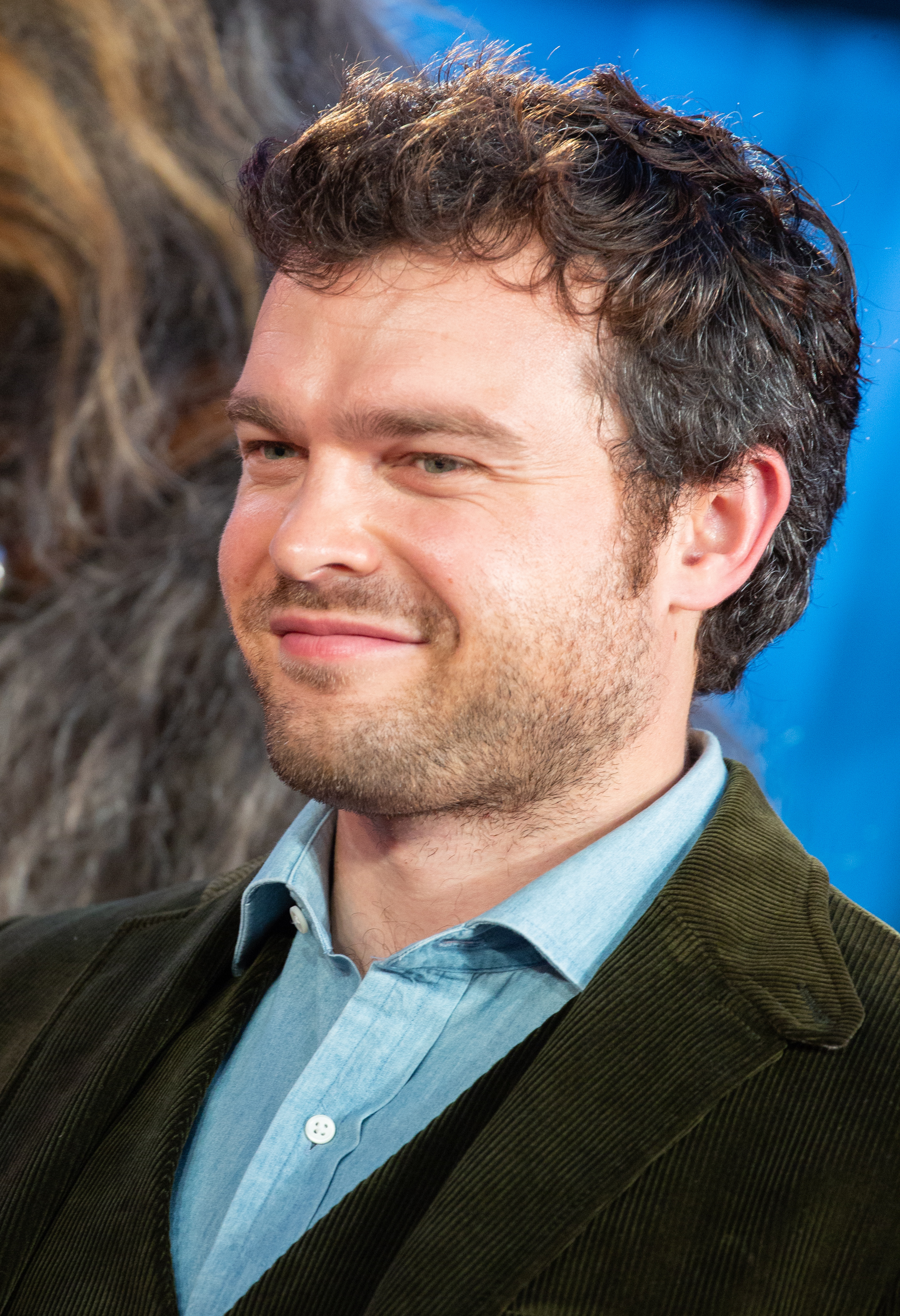
Alden Ehrenreich

- November 1 – Derek Ali, mixing engineer
- November 2
  - Angel Bunner, softball player
  - Katelyn Tarver, singer/songwriter and actress
- November 3
  - Jonathon Acosta, politician
  - Paula DeAnda, singer
- November 5
  - Alvin Alvarez, actor
  - Chris Avalos, boxer
- November 4 – Jarrett Boykin, football player
- November 6
  - Jozy Altidore, soccer player
  - Harry Bush, cricketer
  - Aaron Hernandez, football player (d. 2017)
- November 8
  - SZA, musician
  - Giancarlo Stanton, baseball player
- November 10 – Conrad Bassett-Bouchard, scrabble player
- November 11 – Adam Rippon, Olympic figure skater
- November 12
  - Jana Bieger, German-born gymnast
  - Mikhail Varshavski, Russian-American doctor and YouTuber
- November 13 – Lane Adams, baseball player
- November 14
  - Matthias Bonvehi, soccer player
  - T. Y. Hilton, football player
  - Stella Maeve, actress
  - Jordan Mark Witzigreuter, singer/songwriter
- November 16 – Ryan Anderson, monster truck driver
- November 19
  - Brian Logan Dales, singer/songwriter and frontman for The Summer Set
  - Tyga, rapper
- November 20
  - Zach Anderson, football player
  - Erin Blanchard, Olympic trampoline gymnast
  - Mama Cax, model and disabled rights activist (d. 2019)
  - Chris Fronzak, singer and frontman for Attila
  - Cody Linley, actor
- November 21
  - Colin Anderson, football player
  - Sadie Maubet Bjornsen, Olympic cross country skier
  - Justin Tucker, football player
- November 22
  - Joe Adams, football player
  - Hillary Bor, Kenyan-born Olympic runner
  - Alden Ehrenreich, actor
  - Candice Glover, singer and actress
- November 23 – Corey Baker, baseball player
- November 24 – Aftyn Behn, politician
- November 25 – William Li, livestreamer
- November 26 – Nickardo Blake, Jamaican-born soccer player
- November 27 – Harry Adams, sprinter
- November 28 – Leonardo Bates, football player
- November 30 – Kimberly Hill, Olympic volleyball player

=== December ===
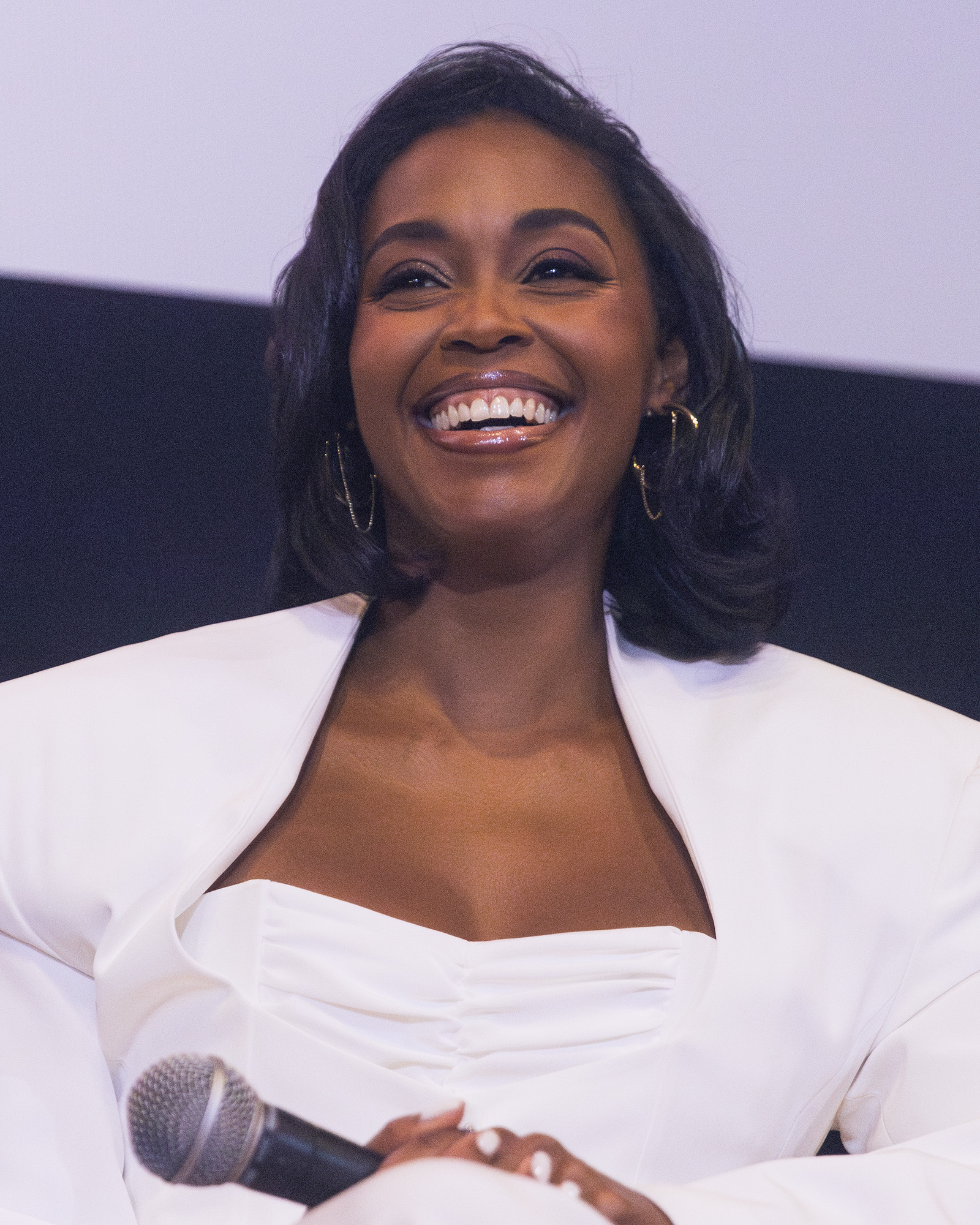
Nafessa Williams

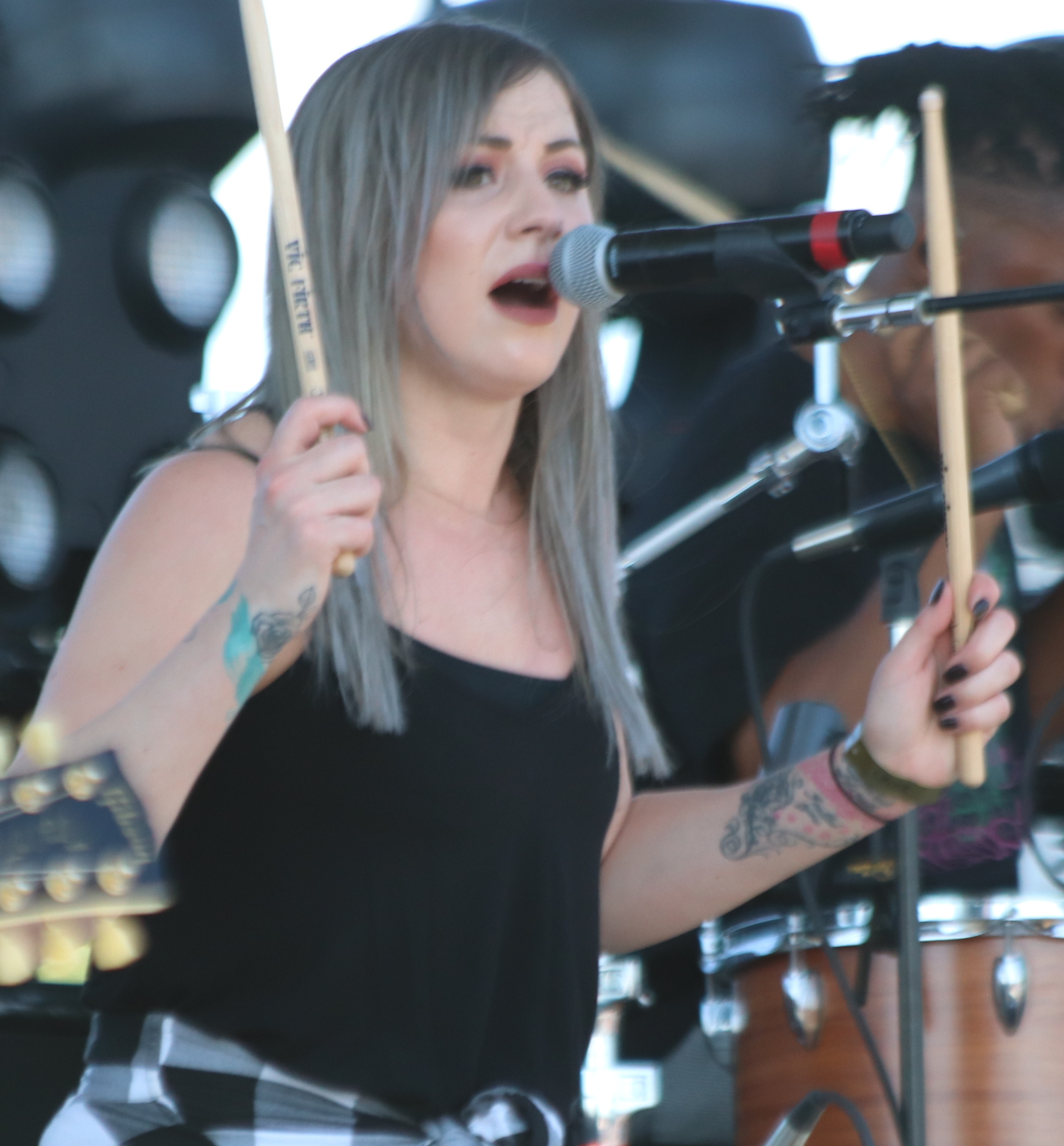
Jen Ledger

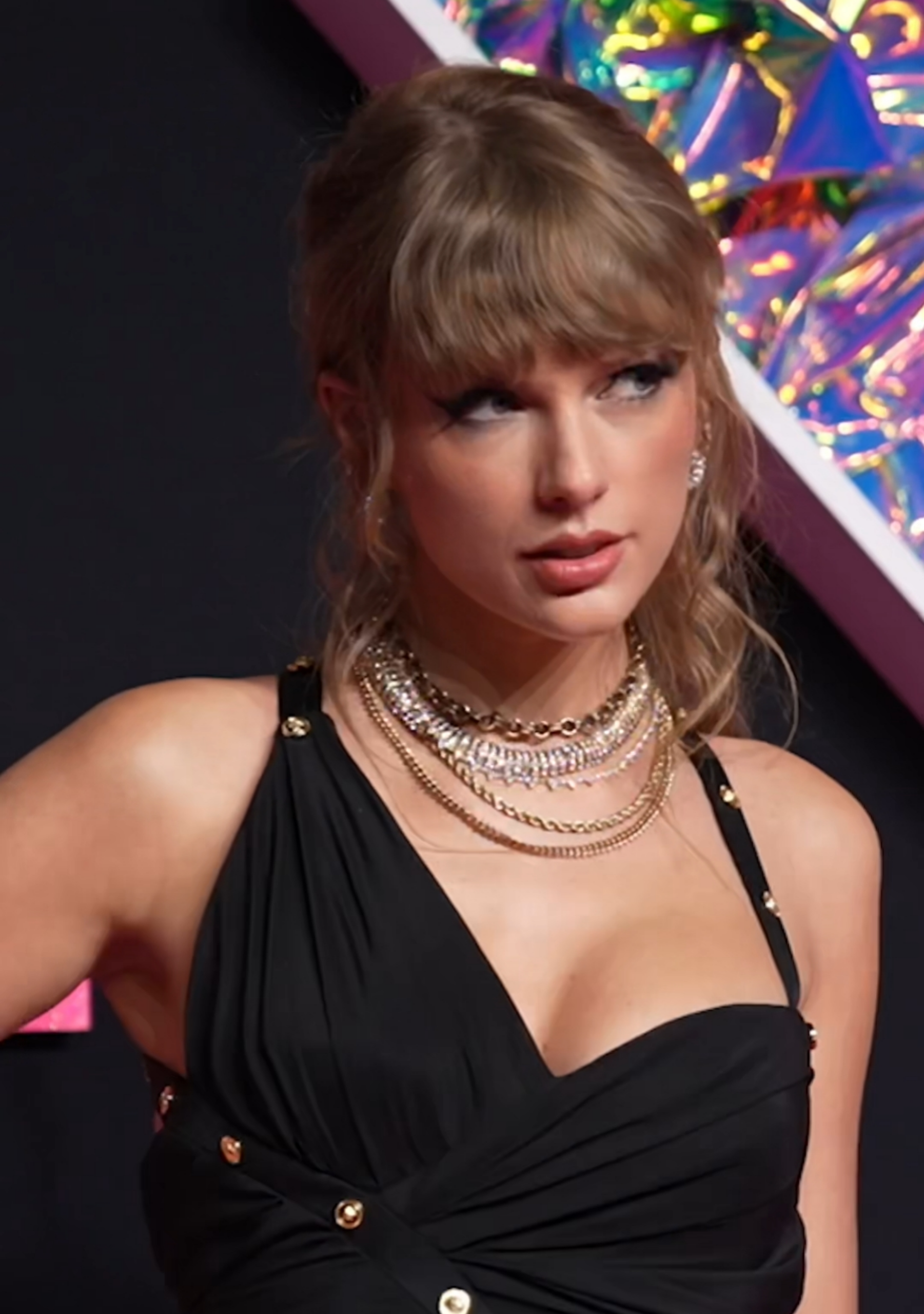
Taylor Swift

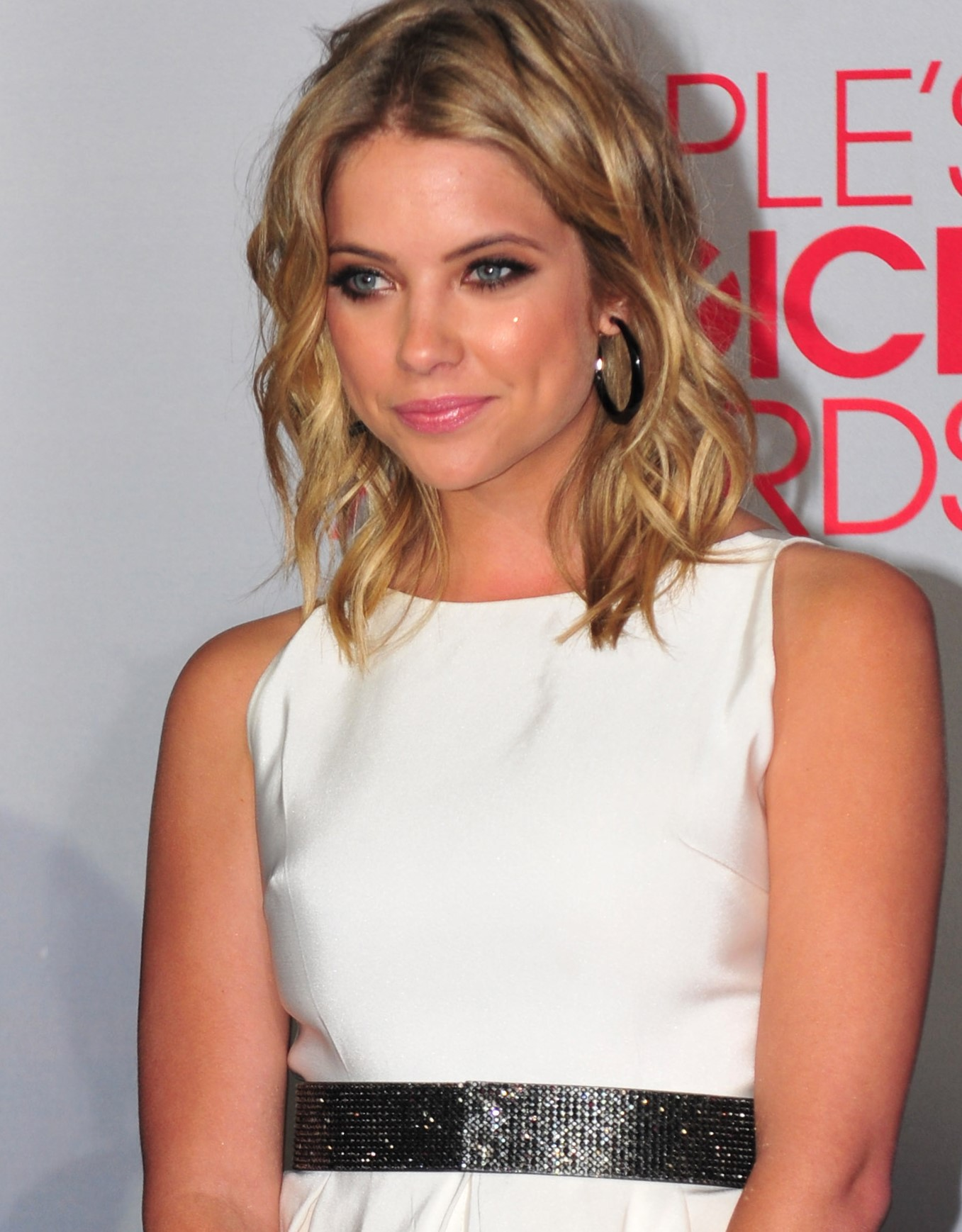
Ashley Benson

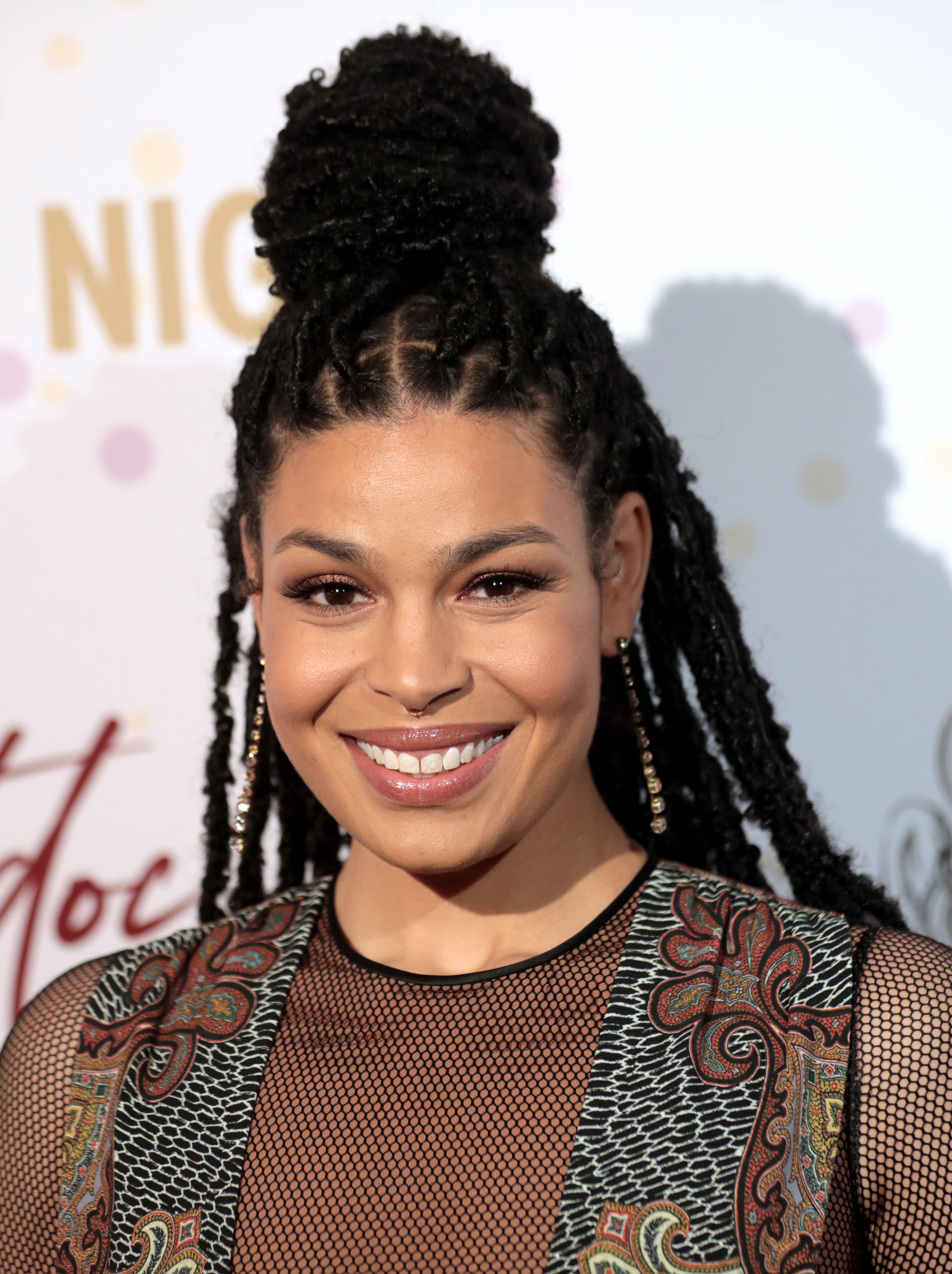
Jordin Sparks

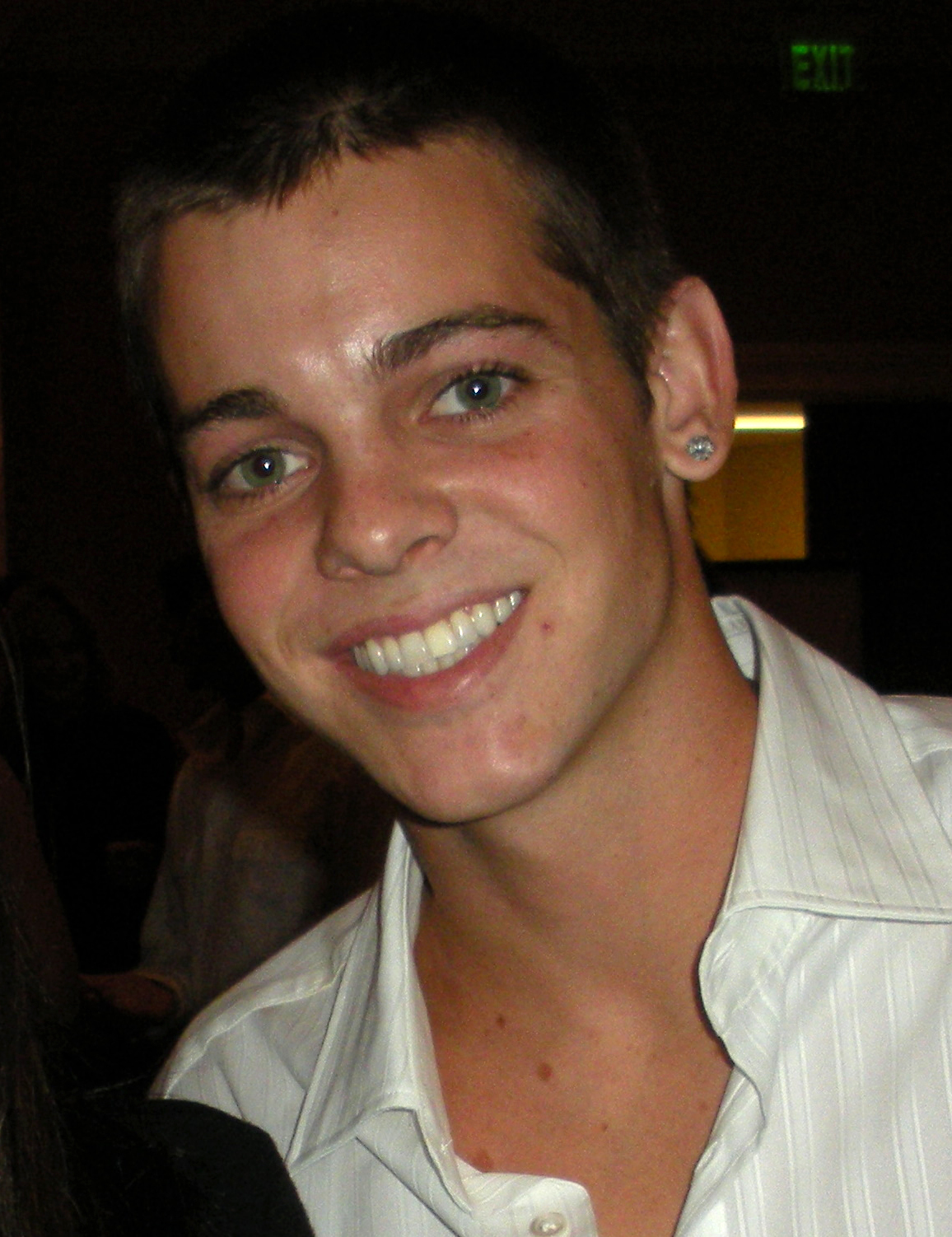
Ryan Sheckler

- December 1
  - Kelechi Anuna, American-born Nigerian basketball player
  - Larry Black, football coach
- December 2
  - Auburn, singer/songwriter
  - Oliver Cooper, actor
  - Robert Turbin, football player
- December 4
  - Garron DuPree, musician
  - Nafessa Williams, actress
- December 5 – Gregory Tyree Boyce, actor
- December 6 – Deshauna Barber, beauty pageant titleholder, motivational speaker, and United States Army captain
- December 8 – Jen Ledger, British-born singer and drummer for Skillet
- December 9 – Eric Bledsoe, basketball player
- December 11
  - Jeff Bernat, Filipino-born singer/songwriter and record producer
  - Stephen Burton, football player
- December 12
  - Janelle Arthur, singer
  - Nick Bailen, American-born Belarusian hockey player
  - Mike Glennon, football player
  - Blaine Milam, convicted murderer (d. 2025)
- December 13
  - Katherine Schwarzenegger, author
  - Taylor Swift, country and pop singer/songwriter
- December 15
  - Ben Blankenship, Olympic middle-distance runner
  - Nichole Bloom, actress and model
  - Jeff Wittek, internet personality
- December 16 – Randy Bullock, football player
- December 17
  - Frank Alexander, football player
  - Carter Arey, wheelchair basketball player
  - Taylor York, guitarist for Paramore
- December 18 – Ashley Benson, actress
- December 19 – Isaiah Anderson, football player
- December 20
  - John Boyett, football player
  - Becky Burke, basketball player and coach
- December 21
  - Quinta Brunson, writer, producer, actress, and comedian
  - Mark Ingram II, football player
- December 22
  - Logan Huffman, actor
  - Patrick Kivlehan, baseball player
  - Jordin Sparks, singer/songwriter and actress
- December 25 – Blayne Barber, golfer
- December 26 – Bassel Bawji, basketball player
- December 28
  - Austin Barnes, baseball player
  - Melissa Bolona, actress and model
  - Mackenzie Rosman, actress
- December 29
  - Drew Barham, basketball player
  - Travis Benjamin, football player
  - Jane Levy, actress
  - Daniel Shaver, man killed by police (d. 2016)
- December 30
  - Tyler Anderson, baseball player
  - Alix Klineman, Olympic beach volleyball player
  - Ryan Sheckler, skateboarder
- December 31 – Akino, American-born Japanese singer/songwriter

=== Full date unknown ===
- Shaindel Antelis, singer/songwriter and actress
- Jamareo Artis, bass guitarist
- American Artist, contemporary artist
- Ben Babbitt, artist and musician
- Daniel Bachman, musician
- Katya Bachrouche, American-born Lebanese Olympic swimmer
- Rachael Bade, journalist
- Sam Bailey, writer, producer, director, and actress
- Ryan Bancroft, conductor
- Leslie Barlow, artist
- Candice Bennatt, lawyer and beauty pageant winner
- Isidore Bethel, American-born French filmmaker
- Stevie Boi, fashion designer and founder of SB Shades
- Annie Booth, jazz pianist
- Katie Bouman, engineer and computer scientist
- Diedrick Brackens, artist
- Juliette Brindak, businesswoman and co-founder of Miss O & Friends
- Lex Brown, artist
- Molly Burhans, cartographer, data scientist, environmental activist, and founder of GoodLands
- Ari Fitz, model, vlogger, television personality, and filmmaker

== Deaths ==
=== January–March ===
- January 1 – Charles Cornell, communist activist (b. 1911)
- January 9 – Bill Terry, baseball player and manager (b. 1898)
- January 13
  - Ray Morehart, baseball player (b. 1899)
  - Joe Spinell, actor (b. 1936)
- January 21 – Billy Tipton, jazz musician (b. 1914)
- January 24 – Ted Bundy, serial killer (b. 1946)
- February 3
  - John Cassavetes, Greek-American filmmaker and actor (b. 1929)
  - Betty Farrington, actress (b. 1898)
- February 11 – George O'Hanlon, actor and television writer (b. 1912)
- February 17 – Lefty Gomez, baseball player (b. 1908)
- February 18 – Mildred Burke, wrestler and trainer (b. 1915)
- March – Edith Achilles, psychologist (b. 1892)
- March 9 – Robert Mapplethorpe, photographer (b. 1946)
- March 11 – William Challee, actor (b. 1904)
- March 12 – Thaddeus B. Hurd, architect and historian (b. 1903)
- March 17 – Merritt Butrick, actor (b. 1959)
- March 20 – Archie Bleyer, song arranger and bandleader (b. 1909)

=== April–June ===
- April 8 – Joseph Crouch, politician (b. 1934).
- April 12
  - Abbie Hoffman, political activist (b. 1936)
  - Herbert Mills, singer, "Mills Brothers" tenor (b. 1912)
  - Sugar Ray Robinson, boxer (b. 1921)
- April 20 – Edward DeSaulnier, politician (b. 1921)
- April 21
  - James Kirkwood Jr., American writer and actor (b. 1924)
  - Paul Mitchell, Scottish hairstylist (b. 1936)
- April 22 – Henry R. Paige, Marine Corps general (b. 1904)
- April 23 – Marc Daniels, television director (b. 1912)
- April 26 – Lucille Ball, film and television comedy actress and model (b. 1911)
- April 30 – Guy Williams, actor (b. 1924)
- May 1 – Sally Kirkland, fashion editor (b. 1912)
- May 3 – Christine Jorgensen, transgender actress, singer, and activist (b. 1926)
- May 15 – Eugenia Clinchard, child actress (b. 1904)
- May 19 – Robert Webber, actor (b. 1924)
- May 20 – Gilda Radner, actress and comedian (b. 1946)
- May 30 – Claude Pepper, U.S. Senator from Florida from 1936 to 1951 (b. 1900)
- June 15 – Victor French, actor and director (b. 1934)

=== July–September ===
- July 1 – William Ching, actor (b. 1913)
- July 3 – Jim Backus, actor (b. 1913)
- July 5 – Odus Mitchell, American football player and coach (b. 1899).
- July 10 – Mel Blanc, voice actor, actor, radio comedian and recording artist (b. 1908)
- July 18 – Rebecca Schaeffer, actress and model (b. 1967)
- July 20 – Mary Treen, actress (b. 1907)
- July 22 – Paul Christoph Mangelsdorf, botanist and agronomist (b. 1899)
- July 24 – Sunshine Sammy Morrison, child actor and comedian (b. 1912)
- July 25 – Steve Rubell, entrepreneur (b. 1943)
- July 30 – Lane Frost, bull rider (b. 1963)
- August 2 – Geraldine Knight Scott, landscape architect (b. 1904)
- August 13 – Tim Richmond, racing driver (b. 1955)
- August 15 – Dorothea Leighton, social psychiatrist (b. 1908)
- August 16 – Amanda Blake, actress (b. 1929)
- August 20 – Joseph LaShelle, cinematographer (b. 1900)
- August 22 – Huey P. Newton, African-American revolutionary and political activist (b. 1942)
- September 17 – Jay Stewart, announcer (b. 1918)
- September 22 – Irving Berlin, composer and lyricist (b. 1888)
- September 28 – Ferdinand Marcos, politician, 10th president of the Philippines (b. 1917)

=== October–December ===
- October 6 – Bette Davis, screen actress (b. 1908)
- October 11 – Paul Shenar, actor and director (b. 1936)
- October 16 – Cornel Wilde, Hungarian-American actor and filmmaker (b. 1912)
- October 25 – Mary McCarthy, novelist, critic and political activist (b. 1912)
- November 5
  - Vladimir Horowitz, Ukrainian-born American classical pianist and composer (b. 1903)
  - Barry Sadler, musician and author (b. 1940)
- November 10 – Cookie Mueller, American actress and writer (b. 1949)
- November 19 – Grant Adcox, race car driver (b. 1950)
- December 1 – Alvin Ailey, African-American choreographer (b. 1931)
- December 6 – Frances Bavier, actress (b. 1902)
- December 7 – Haystacks Calhoun, professional wrestler (b. 1934)
- December 11 – Lindsay Crosby, actor, singer, and son of Bing Crosby (b. 1938)
- December 15 – Arnold Moss, actor (b. 1910)
- December 16 – Lee Van Cleef, actor (b. 1925)
- December 25 – Billy Martin, baseball player and manager (b. 1928)

== See also ==
- 1989 in American television
- List of American films of 1989
- Timeline of United States history (1970–1989)
