= Kelechi =

- Gender: Unisex
- Language: Igbo

Origin
- Meaning: Thank chi
- Region of origin: Igboland

Other names
- Variant form: Kenechi

Kelechi is a common Igbo given name that means "thank chi”. Similarly, there is the name Kelechukwu. The Onitsha people spell them Kenechi/Kenechukwu respectively.

== Mononym ==
- Kelechi, Nigerian-American rapper

== Given name ==
- Kelechi Anuna (born 1989), Nigerian-American basketball player
- Kelechi Francis Ibekwe (born 1984), Nigerian footballer
- Kelechi Iheanacho (footballer, born 1981), Nigerian footballer
- Kelechi Iheanacho (born 1996), Nigerian footballer
- Kelechi "KC" Ohaebosim, American politician
- Kelechi Okoye (born 1984), Nigerian footballer
- Kelechi Osemele (born 1989), American football player
- Kelechi Osunwa (born 1984), Nigerian footballer

== Middle name ==
- Susan Kelechi Watson, American actress
