= Ijeoma =

- Gender: Female
- Language: Igbo

Origin
- Meaning: Good journey
- Region of origin: Igboland

Other names
- Related names: Uzoamaka, Uzoma

Ijeoma // is a common Igbo feminine given name. It means "good journey". Similarly, there is the name Ijemma, which means “beautiful journey”, but this is less common.

== Notable people named Ijeoma ==
- Ije Akunyili, American medical practitioner
- Ijeoma Grace Agu, Nigerian actress
- Ijeoma Ndukwe-Egwuronu, Nigerian entrepreneur
- Ijeoma Nwaogwugwu, Nigerian journalist
- Ijeoma Oluo, American writer
- Ijeoma Onyeator, Kenyan journalist, news anchor and media personality
- Ijeoma Uchegbu, Nigerian-British pharmacist and Professor of Pharmacy
- Ijeoma Umebinyuo, Nigerian poet
