= Mbakwe =

Origin
- Language: Igbo
- Meaning: Let the nation agree

Mbakwe is a surname of Igbo origin that means "let the nation agree”. This is similar to other kwe-suffix names (e.g., Chikwe, Ibekwe, Igbokwe and Ndukwe). Notable people with this surname include:

- Jaylen Mbakwe (born 2005), American college football wide receiver
- Sam Mbakwe (1929–2004), Nigerian politician and first democratic governor of Imo State
- Trevor Mbakwe (born 1989), American professional basketball coach and former player

== See also ==
- Sam Mbakwe Airport, airport in Ngor Okpala Local Government Area, Imo State, Nigeria. Named after Sam Mbakwe
