= Ibekwe =

Origin
- Language: Igbo
- Meaning: may my people agree
- Region of origin: Igboland

Other names
- Variant forms: Ibe(h), Igbokwe

Ibekwe // is an Igbo surname. It means "may my people agree".

Notable people with the name include:

- Chinweizu Ibekwe (born 1943), also known as Chinweizu, Nigerian critic, essayist, poet, and journalist
- Ekene Ibekwe (born 1985), American-born Nigerian basketball player
- Ify Ibekwe (born 1989), American basketball player
- Kelechi Francis Ibekwe (born 1984), professional footballer
- Mariam Ibekwe (born 1969), Nigerian shot putter

== See also ==
- Mbakwe
- Ndukwe
