= Ebubechukwu =

Given name

- Gender: Unisex
- Language: Igbo

Origin
- Meaning: Chukwu's glory
- Region of origin: Igboland

Other names
- Short form: Ebube
- Related names: Chidiebube, Ebubechi, Ebubedike

Ebubechukwu // is an Igbo given name. It means "Chukwu's glory". It is often shortened to Ebube, "glory".

== Notable people with the name Ebube ==
- Ebube Duru (born 1999), Nigerian footballer
- Ebube Muonso (born 1980), Nigerian Catholic priest
- Ebube Nwagbo (born 1983), Nigerian actress and entrepreneur

== See also ==
- Ibekwe
