= LazyNigerianYouths =

Social media revolt

Lazy Nigerian Youths, also known as #LazyNigerianYouths, is a social media revolt by Nigerian youths against President Muhammadu Buhari. While speaking at the Commonwealth Business Forum in Westminster on 18 April 2018, the president said, in response to an interview question about an unrelated topic, that a majority of the Nigerian youths have not been to school and wanted everything free (including education and healthcare) because the country is an oil-producing state. Young Nigerians soon took to social media to protest against Buhari's comment.

== Origin ==
The movement evolved from the 25th meeting of the Commonwealth Heads of Government Meeting 2018. At the Commonwealth Business Forum in Westminster, a journalist had asked the president of Nigeria why he did not sign the African Continental Free Trade Agreement in Rwanda, and while responding to the question, he was reported to have said: "About the economy, we have a very young population, our population is estimated to be 196 million in 2018. This is a very conservative one. More than 60 percent of the population is below 30 years, a lot of them have not been to school and they are claiming that Nigeria is an oil-producing country, therefore, they should sit and do nothing, and get housing, healthcare, education free".

After a report of the event by TheCable staff writer Mayowa Tijani, Nigerians on social media, voiced strong displeasure with millions of Nigerian youth tweeting about their ventures and how they work hard to make a living in a country that has done little to help her citizens survive.

== Controversy ==
Some claimed that the journalist, Tijani Mayowa, must have misquoted the president, or reported out of context, but the video released by the journalist was published widely across local media in Nigeria and republished by CNN, and Al Jazeera. While some of the president's supporters continue to defend him by denying his use of the word-- "lazy", many Nigerians believe that what he said at CHOGM 2018, directly implied that Nigerian youth are lazy.

== Business opportunities ==
Since the social media reaction started, a lot of young Nigerians like Omowumi Ogunrotimi, have started creating business opportunities with the situation - using the avenue to protest, while showcasing the entrepreneurial spirit of Nigerians. Some started advertising and selling shirts, caps and other materials with #LazyNigerianYouth printed on them. Similarly, some Nigerians started posting pictures showing them at work and how hard they work everyday to make ends meet, while others have used the opportunity to advertise their businesses.

According to human rights activist, Omoyele Sowore, the situation is a wake up call for Nigerian Youths to re-evaluate themselves and live up to positive expectations. Omoyele Sowore is the founder of Sahara Reporters and a presidential aspirant for the 2019 elections in Nigeria. Sowore advocates that the Lazy Nigerian Youths should perform their last act of laziness by forming a consensus of support for a candidate of their choosing with the capacity to deliver and voting out the current administration from power. Hundreds of Nigerian online freelancers, digital marketers and lone entrepreneurs protested by showing off their achievements.

== Implications for 2019 election ==
Many Nigerian politicians, especially President Muhammadu Buhari's political opponents, have since, capitalised on the social media backlash with many urging the youths, who were instrumental to the president's election to vote him out in the coming 2019 elections. At the time of the incident, CNN was of the opinion that the president would face a tough battle to get the support of the nation's young people in his re-election bid. With this single trend still in the minds of the Nigerian youth, they have become more alert to the economic importance of their political rights and might lead a very challenging opposition against the incumbent government come 2019 Presidential election. The Nigerian youths are getting more enlightened of their ability to influence a change and make a significance in the political settings as they are a major percentage in the nation's population. The largest block of Nigerian voters constitutes people who are under 30 years. This population can swing the election in 2019, so, the statement by President Buhari is believed to have had a negative impact on his chances to win over the younger population of Nigeria.
