= Simon Kolawole =

Nigerian journalist, public speaker and media entrepreneur

- Education: University of Lagos; University of Sussex; SOAS University of London
- Occupations: Nigerian journalist and media entrepreneur
- Known for: Founder, CEO at TheCable

Simon Kolawole is a Nigerian journalist, public speaker and media entrepreneur. He is the founder and chief executive officer of Cable Newspaper Limited., publisher of TheCable, Nigeria's Independent online newspaper In 2012, the World Economic Forum named him one of the Young Global Leaders as a recognition of his record of professional accomplishments and commitment to the society.

According to Daily Trust, Kolawole, at 29, became the youngest editor of a national newspaper in Nigeria. By 2007, when he was appointed the editor and associate director of This Day, he was also the youngest Nigerian to have ever achieved such a feat.

== Early life and education ==
Kolawole was born in Ilorin, Kwara State, Nigeria, but moved to Mopa, in present-day Kogi State, Nigeria to live with his grandmother after his father died in a road accident in 1976. He moved to Lagos, Nigeria, in 1989 to study Mass Communications at the University of Lagos. He won the Chevening Scholarship to study for a Master's degree in Governance and Development at the Institute of Development Studies, University of Sussex, UK in the 2005/2006 academic year. In 2010, he was selected as one of the Governance for Development Fellows at the School of Oriental and African Studies (SOAS), University of London.

In 2007, he was appointed editor of This Day, regarded as Nigeria’s most influential newspaper. He edited the paper for five years, before he resigned in 2012. He has taken leadership courses at Yale University and Harvard Kennedy School of Government as a Young Global Leader of World Economic Forum.

== Career ==
Kolawole's journey into journalism was inspired by veteran journalist, Dele Giwa, who was killed in the line of duty. Prior to setting up TheCable, Kolawole worked at Encomium Magazine, Complete Football, Thisweek, Tempo, This Day. He was staff writer at Complete Football in 1993; senior correspondent TheNews/TEMPO 1994-95; features writer, later sports editor, Today's News Today 1995-96; assistant editor, City People 1996-97; assistant editor, This Day 1997; features editor This Day, 1998-1999; deputy editor, Financial Standard 1999-2001; editor, TheWeek magazine, 2001-2002; Saturday editor, This Day 2002-2005; managing editor, This Day 2006-07; editor and associate director, This Day 2007-2012.

In 2008, Kolawole published a comprehensive This Day Oil Report, titled "Nigeria and Other Oil-Producing Countries: A Comparative Study". His other works have been cited in the Journal of Asian and African Social Science and Humanities, and in many other academic works

In 2012, Kolawole resigned from his position as editor of THISDAY newspaper and was replaced by Ijeoma Nwaogwugwu.

He is currently the CEO, TheCable; Executive Director, Cable Newspaper Journalism Foundation; Founder and CEO, Ideas Planet Ltd. He is also a member of the board at two non-profit organisation for development in Nigeria; Leap Africa and Rise Networks
