= Edojobs =

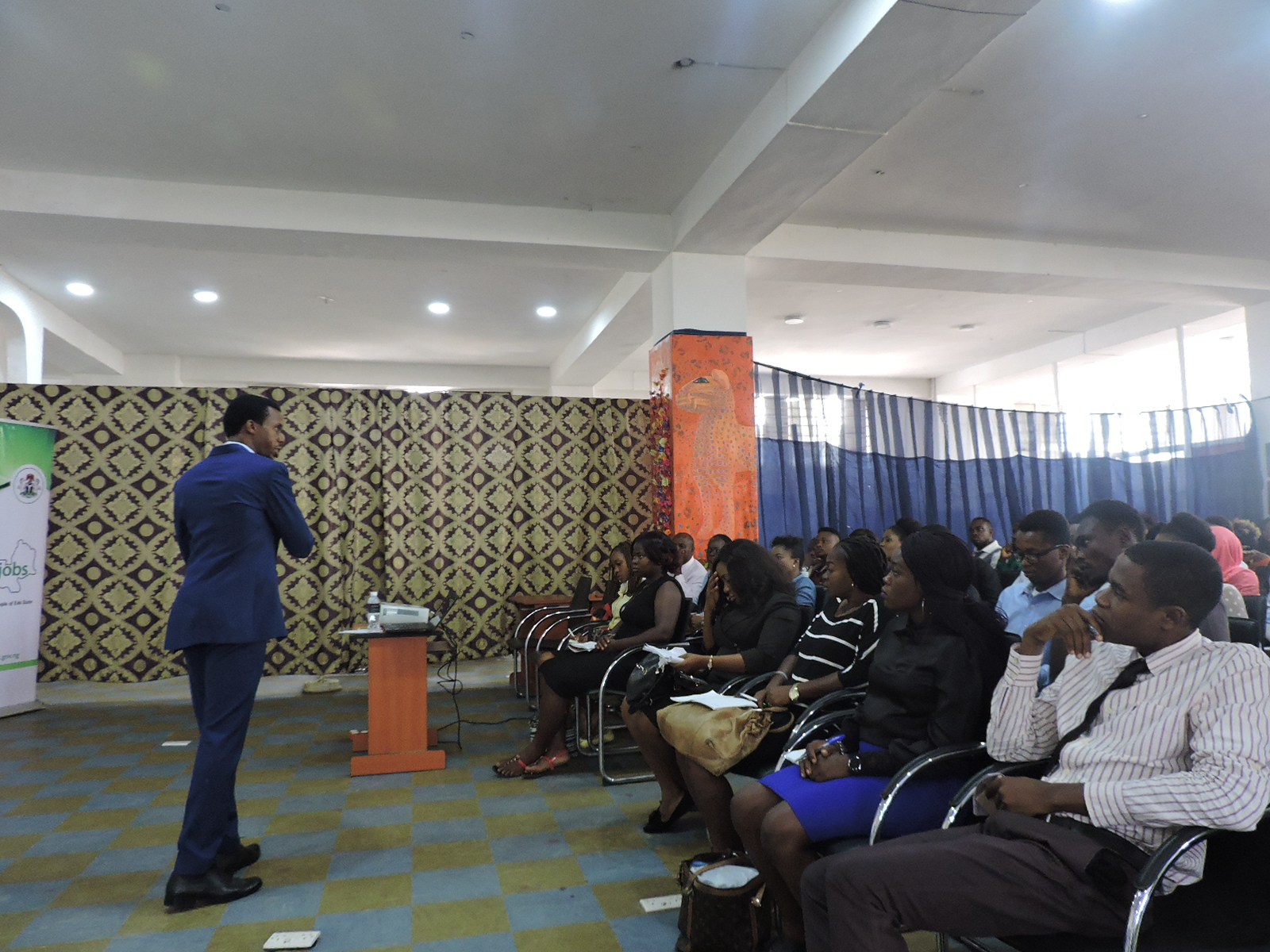
Career Kickstart 2018

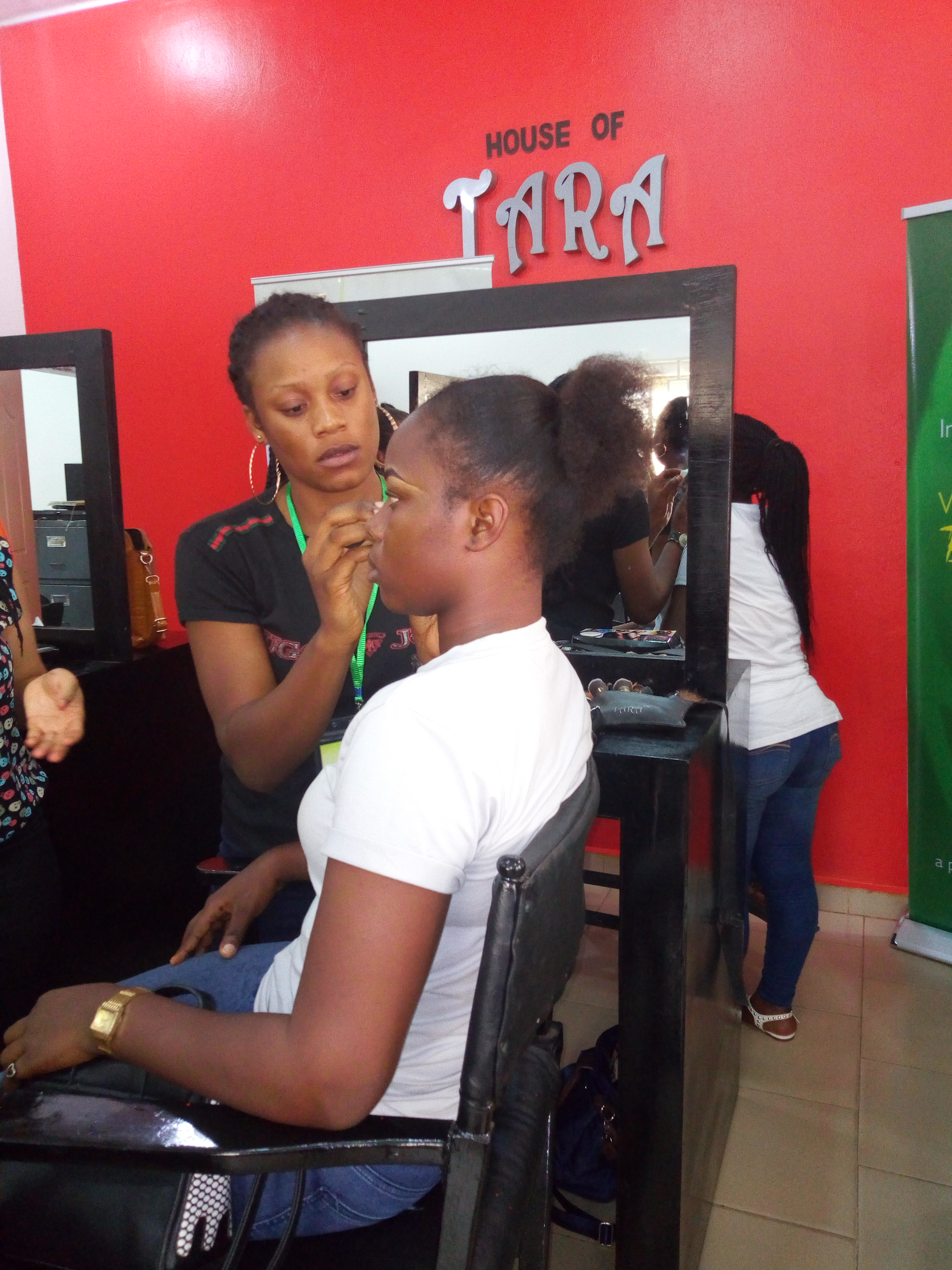
EdoJobs training on cosmetology

Edojobs is an initiative of the Edo State government in Nigeria under the administration of Governor Godwin Obaseki. The initiative is aimed at tackling the high rate of unemployment in Edo State through skills acquisition and empowerment programs, in collaboration with various private and public organizations in Edo State. The initiative was launched in 2016 as part of Obaseki's promise to create 200,000 new jobs for the region's youth.

== Background ==
Based on 2011 statistics, Edo State has an unemployment rate of 35.2%. The program aims to ensure that residents of the State get filled into the various job openings in the state. EdoJobs is run by the Skills Development Programme of the Edo State Governor. It was headed by his Senior Special Adviser on skills development and Job Creation, Mrs. Ukinebo Dare until 2019 when the Agency was signed into law and Mrs. Ukinebo Dare was appointed as the managing director of the Agency. It is now officially known as Edo State Skills Development Agency but still popularly called Edojobs by citizens.

== Programme ==
Some of the skills acquisition and empowerment programs offered by Edojobs includes:

- EdoInnovation Hub
- training/internship and job placement in Edo south
- EdoProduction centre:A cluster for small and medium enterprise in Edo state
- EdoFood and Agriculture Cluster (Ehor, Uhumwonde local government area)
- Soap making training in Edo central
- Entrepreneurship training in Edo south
- Career kickstart program in Edo south
- EdoCreative Hub

== Partnerships ==
The program partners with the following organizations:

- GIZ SKYE and GIZ SEDIN
- GenuisHub
- Amazon Web Services
- Poise Nigeria
- Gidijobs
- Sabihub Nigeria
- Genius Hub
- Law Autos
- Mamamomi
- SLOT Academy
- Interswitch
- FirstBank Nigeria
- Levantar Soap Factory

== Impact ==
The National Bureau of Statistics in 2020 released a report that showed Edo State having the lowest unemployment rate in the South South of Nigeria. Also while there was a rise in unemployment in Nigeria, Edo State witnessed a drop in unemployment.

== 2025 expansion ==
In 2025, the Edo State government announced plans through EdoJobs to train approximately 25,000 youths across the state in various vocational, technical, and digital skills. The proposed training covers sectors such as information and communication technology, agriculture, creative industries, manufacturing, entrepreneurship, and services.

== See also ==
- Economy of Nigeria
- Youth in Nigeria
- Federal Ministry of Labour and Employment (Nigeria)
