= YouWin! =

Nigerian youth development scheme

YouWin! is a youth development scheme established in Nigeria by the administration of President Goodluck Jonathan. The central aim of the scheme is to empower Nigerian youth by providing grants to small business owners. It is run as a competition where entrants submit business plans which are evaluated by the Enterprise Development Center of The Pan-African University. Winners receive up to N10 million (around $64,000), paid in instalments, subject to adherence to the submitted plan. The programme is a private and public initiative that finances outstanding business plans for young entrepreneurs in Nigeria.

== History ==
The programme was launched in Nigeria in 2011. YouWin! is an acronym which stands for Youth Enterprise with Innovation in Nigeria. The programme is a joint product of four government ministries: the Federal Ministry of Finance, Ministry of Communication and Technology, Ministry of Education and Youth Development, and the Ministry of Women Affairs. The goal of the programme is to meet the projection of the government towards creating 3600 young entrepreneurs in the country.

The first edition, designated as YouWin!1, was intended to create jobs by funding youth entrepreneurial projects. The second edition, YouWin!2, was an affirmative action project, specifically targeting women below the age of 45. It awarded grants to over 1200 women. The third edition, YouWin!3, was open to both genders, with a record number of awardees (over 2500).

In June 2016, the Federal Government, through the Ministry of Finance, said that it would consult with beneficiaries and other concerned parties on restructuring the multi-billion Naira Youth Enterprise with Innovation in Nigeria through the YouWin! programme, with the objective of injecting new ideas for its sustainability. As follow-up, the Director of Information at the ministry, Salisu Dambatta, issued a statement saying that a weekly print media enterprise education programme designed to assist entrepreneurs to start, plan and grow their businesses would be launched soon by the Youth Enterprise with Innovation in Nigeria (YouWiN!Connect), and that the publication would be syndicated in five national newspapers.

In July 2017, the programme was rebranded as YouWiN!Connect, which "takes YouWin! to the next level" as a business education initiative.

Since its inception, the programme has resulted in the creation of 3,900 enterprises.

== Function of the programme ==
The fund granted by YouWin! is an equity co-investment to the business of awardees. Applicants must be young Nigerians and have a business plan for a registered company with the Corporate Affairs Commission in Nigeria. The fund disbursement is provided through any of the participating commercial banks in Nigeria.

Members of the advisory board include the Finance Minister, Kemi Adeosun; Minister of State, Industry, Trade and Investment, Aisha Abubakar; founder and C.E.O of House of Tara International and pioneer of the bridal make-up profession in Nigeria, Tara Fela-Durotoye, Former Banker and current MD/CEO of L & Z Integrated Farms, Alhaji M.D. Abubakar, Founders of the Prince Ebeano Supermarket chain, Sunday Egede and David Chukwuma Ojei, founder and managing director of Sankore Investments and venture eapitalist Titi Odunfa Adeoye; and the managing director of the new Development Bank of Nigeria.

== See also ==
- Youth in Nigeria
