= Mayowa Tijani =

Nigerian Journalist

- Born: Oluwamayowa Tijani; October 31; Oyo, Oyo State, Nigeria
- Citizenship: Nigeria
- Education: University of Ibadan (B.Tech) Nigerian Institute of Journalism, Lagos; University of Sussex, Brighton, UK.
- Occupation: Journalist
- Years active: 2012–Present
- Organization: TheCable
- Known for: Reporting
- Website: The Mayowa Tijani on X

Oluwamayowa Tijani is a Nigerian journalist, public speaker, fact-checker and the editor-at-large of TheCable. In 2023, he led the development of Nigeria's first disability and inclusion news app, TheCable DINA. He's a graduate of the University of Ibadan, Ibadan; the Nigerian Institute of Journalism, Lagos; and holds a master's degree in media Practice for Development and Social Change from the University of Sussex—via the UK government Chevening scholarship.

== Early life and education ==
Tijani was born in Oyo Town, Oyo State, but started his education at Makurdi International School in the Benue State Capital. Most of his primary education was at Air Force Primary Schools in Ilorin, Kwara State and Ibadan, Oyo State. He had his secondary education at the Air Force Comprehensive School, Ibadan, from 2001 to 2007. He attended Nigeria's Premier University, the University of Ibadan, graduating with a degree in Food Technology in 2014. By 2015, he enrolled at the Nigerian Institute of Journalism (NIJ) for a post-graduate diploma in Print Journalism. In 2017, he was awarded a British Government Chevening Scholarship to study for a master's degree in media Practice for Development and Social Change at the University of Sussex in Brighton UK, where he graduated in 2018. Along with regular education, he also studied Financial Journalism through the Bloomberg Media Initiative Africa (BMIA), taught by the University of Lagos, Gordon Institute of Business Science, University of Pretoria, and the Lagos Business School.

== Career ==
His journey into mainstream journalism in Nigeria started when he joined TheCable newspaper in August 2014 as a graduate intern, rising through the ranks to become the newspaper's first business and development editor as of October 2018. In 2015, Tijani was selected as one of the few journalists from Africa to be trained by the United Nations Millennium Campaign as a media ambassador for the Sustainable Development Goals (SDGs). By 2016, he won the best team award at the Bloomberg Media Initiative Africa (BMIA). His work in journalism and advocacy led him to become a finalist for The Future Awards Africa Prize for excellence in journalism and the Thomson Foundation Young Journalist of the Year in 2017.

Tijani has attended and reported on numerous international development events, including the World Bank/IMF meetings, the Gates Foundation's Goalkeepers Summit, and the Commonwealth Head of Government Forum (CHOGM). His reports from CHOGM 2018 in the United Kingdom were particularly impactful, inspiring the #LazyNigerianYouth hashtag and subsequent national movement.

In December 2018, Tijani conducted Nigeria's first-ever live fact check during an electoral debate. He won the second prize at Africa's Best Fact-Checking Awards in Johannesburg in 2019.

He joined Global News Agency, AFP in 2019, leading its fact-checking operations in West Africa, publishing more than 200 fact-checks on a broad range of issues from politics to health. In 2020, he was one of only three Nigerian journalists certified by the World Trade Organization (WTO) to provide coverage in the selection process for the director-general of the organisation, which saw Ngozi Okonjo-Iweala clinch the position. In 2022, he left AFP to join Twitter’s first team in Africa, domiciled in Accra, Ghana, where he supported efforts against misinformation, disinformation and hate speech on the social network, especially across elections in Kenya and Nigeria.

Tijani joined the Centre for Democracy and Development as a consultant in December 2022, leading Nigeria's first Social Media War Room to tackle information disorder before, during, and after the 2023 elections. He shared his insights on the elections with the Reuters Institute of Journalism at the University of Oxford.

Throughout his career, Mayowa has reported on and interviewed prominent global figures, including Bill Gates, the co-founder of the trillion-dollar company Microsoft.

== Honours and awards ==
- Winner, Gates Foundation Goalkeepers Accelerator funding awards (2022)
- Royal African Young Leadership Forum (RAYLF) Awards (2021) by Ooni of Ife, Oba Adeyeye Enitan Ogunwusi.
- US State Department International Visitors Leadership Programme (IVLP) 2020
- Second prize winner, Africa Check fact-checking awards (2019)
- 100 Most Influential Young Nigerians (2019)
- Chevening Scholarship Award - FCDO, UK, (2017)
- Finalist, Young Journalist of the Year - Thomson Foundation, 2017
- Finalist, Young Journalist of the Year - The Future Awards Africa, 2017
- Winner of the Nigerian Championship of Public Speaking - Toastmasters International, 2013
