= Taiwo Adebulu =

Nigerian journalist

- Education: Obafemi Awolowo University, Obafemi Awolowo University
- Occupation: Journalist
- Years active: 2014 – current

Taiwo Adebulu is a Nigerian investigative journalist of the Nigerian newspaper, TheCable.

== Early life, education and career ==
Adebulu had his education at Obafemi Awolowo University, where he earned a bachelor's degree in language arts. He then went to University of Ibadan and graduated with a master's degree in Communication Arts.

In 2014, Adebulu began his career as a freelance writer for The Nation. He also serves as the features and investigations editor at TheCable.

== Awards and recognitions ==
In 2018, Adebulu was nominated for the Future Awards Africa Prize for Journalism. He has also won the African Fact-Checking Award, PwC's Media Excellence Award in 2020 and was named TheCables journalist of the year in 2021.

In 2023, he was shortlisted for the Fetisov Journalism Awards for his report about students who were kidnapped from the Federal Government College in Birnin-Yauri, Kebbi state in 2021 and a recipient of the rare diseases reporting fellowship of the National Press Foundation (NPF).

Adebulu is a Pulitzer Center grantee.
