= Uzoamaka =

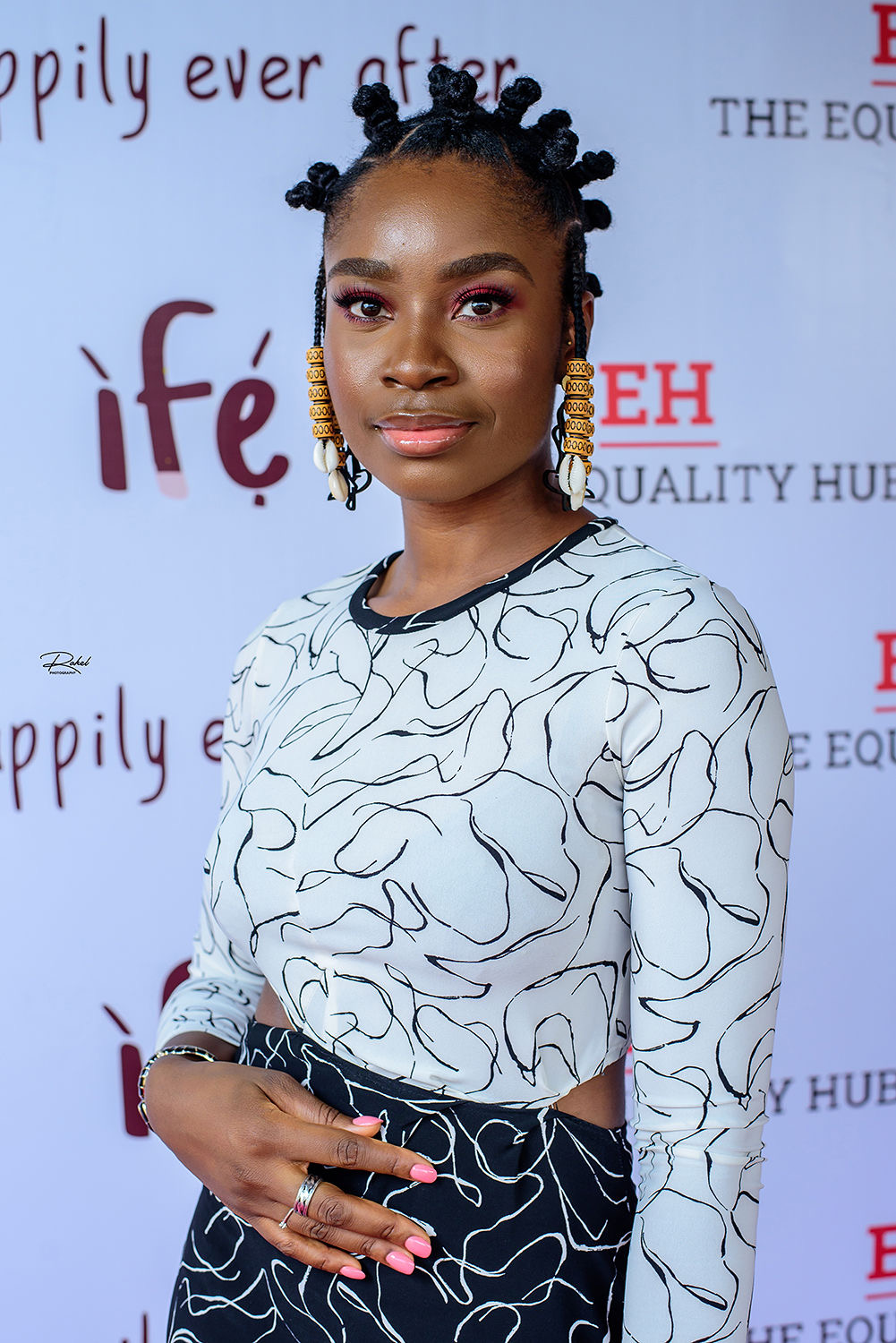
- Uzoamaka Power in 2020
- Gender: Female
- Language: Igbo

Origin
- Meaning: The road is beautiful
- Region of origin: Igboland

Other names
- Related names: Ijeoma, Uzoma

Uzoamaka is a feminine Igbo given name. It means “the road is beautiful”.

== Notable people named Uzoamaka ==
- Peace Uzoamaka Nnaji (born December 28, 1952), Nigerian politician
- Uzoamaka Aduba (born February 10, 1981), American actress
- Uzoamaka Power (born April 10, 1990), Nigerian actress
- Uzoamaka Onuoha, Nigerian actress
- Uzoamaka Otuadinma (born December 18, 1990), Nigerian taekwondo practitioner
