= Uzoma =

- Gender: Unisex
- Language: Igbo

Origin
- Meaning: good road
- Region of origin: Igboland

Other names
- Related names: Ijeoma, Uzoamaka

Uzoma // is a unisex given name and surname of Igbo origin. It means “good road,” being similar in connotation to Ijeoma.

== Given name ==
- John Uzoma Ekwugha Amaechi (born 1970), English basketball player and psychologist
- Uzoma Asagwara (born 1984), Canadian politician and basketball player
- Uzoma Azuka (born 1970), Nigerian handballer
- Uzama Douglas (1998–2016), Nigerian footballer
- Uzoma Dozie (born 1969), Nigerian banker
- Uzoma Emenike, Nigerian politician and diplomat
- Uzoma Nwachukwu (born 1990), American football player
- Jude Uzoma Ohaeri, Nigerian professor and academic
- Uzooma Okeke (born 1970) American football player
- Uzoma Okwuchi Osimkpa, Nigerian actress

== Surname ==
- C. J. Uzomah (born 1993), American football player
- Eke Uzoma (born 1989), Nigerian footballer
- Felix Anudike-Uzomah (born 2002), American football player
- Genny Uzoma, Nigerian actress
- Ike Uzoma (born 1978), Nigerian footballer

== See also ==
- List of Igbo people
