= Kelechi (rapper) =

American rapper from Atlanta

- Born: Kelechi Emeonye; Atlanta, U.S.
- Genres: Hip hop, Afro-Centric, R&B
- Instrument: Vocals
- Years active: 2014
- Label: STNDRD Music

Kelechi Emeonye, known mononymously as Kelechi or Kelechief, is an American rapper. He rose to prominence in 2014 with the release of the single "Want", off his first EP, Loose Change. In 2016, he won a rap contest sponsored by Mountain Dew's Green Label Sound for "Want". He won Best Song - Dance/Electronica at the 16th Independent Music Award in 2018.

== Early life ==
Kelechi Emeonye was born in Atlanta to Nigerian parents. He is a native of the Igbo people, from the Eastern region of Nigeria. He dropped out of Georgia State University to start a rapping career in his basement at home. In 2015, he opened for Chance, and Wale at Family Matters Tour. In 2016, he won the $50,000 prize for a rap contest sponsored by Mountain Dew's Green Label Sound.

Kelechi started out releasing projects under the stage name "SUBMiT", prior to 2014 he changed his stage name to Kelechi. His musical influence is inspired by the words of Common, the melodies of Nelly, and the charisma of Kanye. He tell's The Masquerade.

== Career ==
In 2014, Kelechi first gained attention from SoundCloud, following the release of his first extended play Loose Change. On 1 December 2016, he released his first studio album Before the Quarter through STNDRD Music, shortly after he won the rap contest. The project lead singles where "Play With My Hair" and " Immigrant Son". On 11 December 2017, he released his second studio album Quarter Life Crisis, with guess appearance from K Camp, VanJess, Phay and Ezi. On 4 April 2018, he released his first mixtape album Woke Up To Winter, and his second mixtape on 29 June 2018, titled Spring Breakup, through STNDRD Music, with guess appearance from Zip K, Phay, and Hanna Lashay. In 2019, he toured with Jidenna, and performed at 85 to Africa tour. On 17 February 2021, he released his third studio album Going Home, with guess appearance on the feature from Jidenna, Phay, and Yungmoonling. On 9 July 2021, Kelechi announced Going Home Nigeria show via Instagram, titled Going Home, Homecoming Concert at Hard Rock Cafe Lagos, on 4 December 2021.

On 5 September 2018, he won Best Song - Dance/Electronica at the Independent Music Awards, via Anish Sood single "Starry Night".

== Discography ==
=== Singles ===
List of singles released as a lead artist, with selected details
Year	Title	Albums
2015	"3AM In Decatur"	Non-album single
2016	"Play With My Hair"	Before the Quarter
2017	"See You Grow"	Non-album singles
2017	"Gone"	Non-album singles
2017	"Be Right Back"	Non-album singles
2017	"Shaquille O'Neal's Quarter Life Crisis"	Non-album singles
2019	"I Told You"	Non-album singles
2019	"Better" (feat. Deante' Hitchcock)	Non-album singles
2019	"Run It Up"	Non-album singles
2019	"Ni**as Really On Tour"	Going Home
2020	"Waiting For You"	Going Home
2020	"Money In The Way"	Non-album single
2020	"Road Life"	Going Home
2020	"On Me"	Going Home
2020	"Like My Dad"	Going Home
2021	"Thank You"	Going Home
2021	"The World (Interlude)"	Going Home
2021	"Get High" (feat. Phay)	Going Home
2021	"Waiting For You (remix)" (feat. Yungmoonling)	Going Home
2021	"Ride For You"	Going Home
2021	"Going Home"	Going Home
2021	"DFWM"	Going Home

=== Extended play(s) ===
List of extended plays with selected details
Title	EP Details
Loose Change	Released: 8 December 2014; Formats: Digital download, streaming

=== Studio album(s) ===
List of studio albums with selected details
Title	Details
Before the Quarter	Released: 1 December 2016; Label: STNDRD Music; Formats: Digital download, streaming
Quarter Life Crisis	Released: 11 December 2017; Label: STNDRD Music; Formats: Digital download, streaming
Going Home	Released: 17 February 2021; Label: STNDRD Music; Formats: Digital download, streaming
Big Booty Mountain Man	Released: 8 May 2026; Label: 200 Percent Productions; Formats: Digital download, streaming

=== Mixtape(s) ===
List of mixtapes with selected details
Title	Details
Woke Up To Winter	Released: 4 April 2018; Label: STNDRD Music; Formats: Digital download, streaming
Spring Breakup	Released: 29 June 2018; Label: STNDRD Music; Formats: Digital download, streaming
