= Kelechi Anuna =

Nigerian-American basketball player

Kelechi "KC" Oliver Anuna
No. 20 – Potros de Nuevo Casa Grandes
- Position: Point guard / shooting guard
- League: LBE

Personal information
- Born: December 1, 1989 (age 36) Raleigh, North Carolina, United States
- Listed height: 6 ft 3 in (1.91 m)
- Listed weight: 212 lb (96 kg)

Career information
- High school: McGavock High School
- College: Pfeiffer – MTSU
Medals
Men's basketball
Representing Nigeria
AfroBasket
Silver medal – second place	2017 Tunisia/Senegal

Kelechi "KC" Oliver Anuna (born December 1, 1989) is a Nigerian-American basketball player for Potros de Nuevo Casa Grande of Liga de Básquetbol Estatal de Chihuahua (LBE) and the Nigerian national team.

He participated at the AfroBasket 2017.
