= TheCable =

Nigerian independent online newspaper

TheCable is an independent online newspaper in Nigeria. It was launched on April 29, 2014, by Simon Kolawole, the former editor of This Day newspaper. Its publisher, Cable Newspaper Ltd., was established on November 29, 2011.

== Key staff ==
- Fisayo Soyombo – Pioneer Editor (April 2014 to January 2017)
- Taiwo Adebulu – Features and investigations editor
- Kolapo Olapoju – Editor
- Simon Kolawole – CEO
- Mayowa Tijani – Editor-at-large
