= Youth in Mongolia =

Youth in Mongolia constituted 18.7% of the population in 2014, numbering roughly 552,000 individuals. The 15–19 age group is the largest in Mongolia; in 2009 about 40% of the population was under 19 years old. Estimated population growth rates as of 2014 were reported as increasing by 1.37%. The steady increase in youth will enlarge the already large proportion of working-aged individuals and create new opportunities to build human capital and facilitate economic development.

In order to address Mongolia's economic future, Mongolia's Parliament adopted the State Population Development Policy in 2004 to confront development issues facing Mongolian youth. This policy and the Mongolia National Programme on Adolescents and Youth Development defined youth as those from ages 15 to 34 years and aims to provide opportunities and services that build youth into well developed citizens. Mongolia is in the process of transitioning from its status as a developing country to a nation with a developing economy. According to the Human Development Index, conditions in Mongolia have been improving in recent years, but its ranking on the Human Poverty Index has dropped further due to the privatization of the economic sector.

Mongolia's political structure has changed frequently since its founding in 1206. In the most recent transition to democracy in 1992, Mongolia incorporated policies directed towards youth. Mongolia became one of the first countries to ratify the Convention on the Rights of the Child in 1990 and signed the second and third optional protocols in 2000 and 2013 respectively. Many of Mongolia's laws and policies attempt to protect and better the lives of Mongolian youth. The legal age of majority occurs at 18, wherein Mongolian young adults are able to vote and assume legal authority. The transition from a Soviet satellite state to a sovereign nation in 1992 fueled major structural changes in Mongolian youth lives. Access to education, employment, and health care has increased.

== Education ==
The transition to a market based economy has impacted the Mongolian education system and labor market. The formal school system comprises pre-school, primary, secondary and higher education. Based on Soviet models, the Mongolian education system requires 10 years of schooling. The current system has a 5+4+3 structure; four years of primary education, four years of basic or incomplete secondary education, and complete secondary school for the final two years. The Mongolian Constitution, Education Law, and the Law on Primary and Secondary Education dictates that eight years of compulsory education are free.

=== Males verse Females ===
Before 1990, education attainment was higher than the current rate. Rural and urban boys are prone to dropping out of school to obtain low skill and low wage employment. The World Health Organization found in 2007 that 8,775 school-aged children were not in school. Of these 8,775 children, 59.1% of drop-outs were boys and of this percentage 91.3% were boys from rural areas. Rural boys are two times more likely to receive no education at all or have below compulsory education over girls due to the need for boys to help their family herd cattle. The gender parity index has revealed that more boys are enrolled in primary education (GPI=0.97) but more girls are enrolled in secondary (GPI=1.08) and tertiary education (GPI=1.54). Parents are more inclined to send young girls to school in order to secure their futures whereas young boys are more likely to inherit family property by surviving in harsh working conditions.

=== Urban versus Rural ===
Multiple disparities exist between educational attainment in rural and urban settings. In rural areas, 6.4% of youth receive no education, which is three times higher compared to urban youth. The transition to a market system is the cause of higher illiteracy and drop out rates because many poor, rural households experienced economic hardships after the closure of cooperative farms.

Regional constraints affect the availability of education, most commonly in rural areas. Statistical analysis has found a high correlation rate between parents and children’s educational attainment. Human capital gained and transferred from the educational level of parents is directly correlated with that of their children. Youth with vast human capital are able to move to larger aimag centers to continue their studies. Most higher secondary education and colleges are only available in large city’s like Mongolia’s capital Ulaanbaatar.

== Labor and employment ==
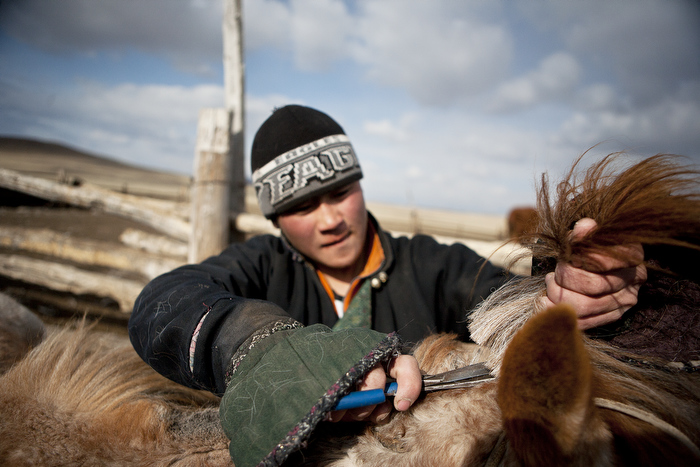
Rural young men tend to their horses before herding cattle.

Under the Labor Law and the Ministry of Social Welfare and Labor, Mongolian youth can legally work when they are 15 years old with parental permission, and those aged 14 can begin vocational training and employment. Labor codes dictate that the working week is 40 hours and 36 hours for those under 18.

Culturally appropriate jobs are rarely found by Mongolian youth, which translates into high youth unemployment rates in urban areas and very low productivity in rural areas. Private sector growth has been slow after the transition to capitalism, which has increased youth unemployment in urban areas and consequently many households resort to youth leaving school and taking employment in the agricultural sector.

The 2006 School-to-Work Transition Survey revealed that of the youth surveyed 22.8% were unemployed and were registered with the employment office. In the same survey 66.1% of youth were employed as unpaid family workers, 23.9% had paid work and 8.3% were self-employed, 0.9% had a part-time job and 0.9% were employed but absent from work. Only one out of two jobs are wage paying jobs and are more commonly held by urban youth. Young women are more likely to be self-employed in urban areas, whereas young men are more frequently self-employed in rural locations. Gender gaps in employment opportunities are present, in which young men have a higher unemployment rate compared to female counterparts. Women at younger ages have lower unemployment rates due to higher educational attainment, and consequently higher rates of long-term unemployment.

Academic training is preferred over technical education and vocational skills which has resulted in unfilled positions in trades. In total, unemployment rates were 15.3% lower for youth with vocational degrees compared to 11.6% of youth with tertiary degrees. Underage employment is common in rural communities particularly in the herding and mining sectors. Underage urban youth may work in poor working conditions generally in informal markets such as manufacturing. In 2009 56,000 5-17 year olds were engaged in child labor, 43,000 were below the minimum working age of 15 and 13,000 15-17 year olds were involved in hazardous work.

== Health ==
Issues related to sexual and reproductive health, tobacco and alcohol usage, infectious disease and environmental related health issues are major concerns for Mongolian youth. All medical and hospital services are free and health care is under the control of state.

The World Health Organization established and supports nine adolescent-friendly clinics around Mongolia. The clinic staff is trained on the adolescent orientation package which promotes preventive messages on psychosocial, nutritional, diseases prevention and sexual aspects of health. Although the clinics were youth friendly, the clinics lacked space, were not easy to reach, and were not open during convenient times for youth to access. The WHO 2002 reports show that 34% of youth surveyed were afraid that the health services received at these clinics were inadequate, 57.3% of the same youth surveyed reported that health care workers were inattentive to their health concerns and problems as well as giving poor services.

=== Sexual and Reproductive Health ===
The 2008 Reproductive Health Survey revealed that 16.7% of 15-19 year olds surveyed responded that they had had sexual intercourse. 5.0% had their first sexual intercourse between 14 and 16 and 11.7% between the ages 17–19. This is in contrast to the Reproductive Health Survey of 2003, no adolescents reported having sexual intercourse for the first time between the ages of 11 and 13. The average age of first sexual intercourse for males was 16.8 and 18.9 for females. These results were similar for youth in both rural and urban areas.

The World Health Organization surveys found that youth's knowledge about contraceptives was high while use was low. Of the 1044 youth surveyed between the ages of 15 and 19 reported that 92.7% had knowledge of any modern method, 3.7% were currently using male condoms, IUDs and pills, and 33.5% knew that contraceptives were distributed without charge. The usage of contraceptives among females who reported having sexual intercourse during the month before the survey reported that 31.8% used condoms, 56.8% of those who were never married used condoms, and 39.7% of urban females used condoms compared to 16.7% of rural females.

Legislation regarding youth sexual and reproductive health is prominent as seen by the Criminal Code of 2002 and the Health Act of 1998. Criminal Code of 2002 states that sexual intercourse with a minor under the age of 16 is punishable and abortion in nonmedical conditions or abortion by a nonprofessional is punishable. According to the Health Act of 1998 "abortion performed only in medical conditions that meet requirements and by licensed medical specialists as specified in the Law" are permitable.

=== Tobacco and Alcohol ===
The 2010 Global School based Student Health Survey report found that 82.9% of males and 70.5% of females students age 13-15 had smoked cigarettes before the age of 14. 64.2% of those sampled in the same survey had been exposed to second-hand smoke at home. Of current youth smokers, 86.5% wanted to stop smoking while 65.3% of these same youth had received help to do so. The same survey found that 80% of youth agreed that smoking should be banned from public places. Under the new Tobacco Law of 2005, adolescents are forbidden from buying and selling tobacco. Legislation governing alcohol was amended in 2000, banning the sale of alcohol to minors under the age of 21. The 2005 Global School based Student Health survey and the 2000 Adolescents' Needs Assessment Survey reported 15-19 year olds had the highest mean alcohol consumption wherein urban adolescents drank twice as much alcohol as rural adolescents. The 2010 Global School based Student Health Survey revealed that 79.4% of youth had consumed alcohol once a month or less. Of the respondents aged 15–19, 70.8% of males and 86.7% of females had not drunk in the last year, which had dropped significantly since the 2005 report.

=== Infectious Disease ===
The World Health Organization has classified Mongolia as a low-prevalence STI country, yet the risk environment is increasing. Roughly half of the population is under the age of 23, which makes sexually active youth the most vulnerable population. The United Nations Volunteer program, STI & HIV/AIDS Prevention among Vulnerable Groups in Mongolia 2007-2009, reports that prevention and awareness methods were not tailored to target sexually active youth. The main goal of this project was to reduce risky sexual behavior and develop programs that address issues of prevention for youth. The 2010 United Nations General Assembly Special Session reports found that over half of the adolescents reported that they felt that they did not have any risk of contracting HIV and one fourth considered themselves to be at low risk.

=== Environmental Health ===
The Systematic Review of the Impact of the Environment on Health in Mongolia revealed that poor environmental management and behaviors have increased Mongolian children's exposure to environmental risk factors and adverse health outcomes. The results from the study indicate that respiratory diseases and neurodevelopment disorders among youth are common due to significant exposure to outdoor and indoor air pollution, metals, tobacco smoke and other chemical toxins.

== Ethnicity ==
Mongolia has been ruled by various nomadic empires, the Qing dynasty and the Soviet Union. The blending of many cultures has influenced youth identities with their ethnicities and traditional nomadic lifestyles. The transition to a market economy has brought about rapid urbanization and a change in modern-day youth identities.

Mongolia's demographics reveal that Mongol groups make up approximately 95% of the population. There are over 20 different subgroupings of Mongol ethnicities and tribal affiliations. The largest ethnic group is composed of Khalkha, Buryats and Oirats Mongols. After the dissolution of Soviet control, nearly half of Mongolian Kazakhs youth and their families left Mongolia to find new sources of economic livelihood. Many of these youth were traditional livestock herders and were expected to conform to gender roles; the move to Kazakhstan proved to be dismal and by 2000 over one third that migrated came back to Mongolia.

Steven Harrell's book, Cultural Encounters on China's Ethnic Frontiers, reveals identification with Mongol heritage differs for rural and urban youth. Pastoral rural Mongol youth identify their nomadic way of life was a basic foundation of Mongolian identity. Boundaries between non-monogols and the Han were created by rural youth through identification with the Mongolian language. Urban youth viewed and required ethnic education as a way to create a cultural space and to understand their common mythical history and family ties to the Mongolian population as a whole.
