= Youth in Nigeria =

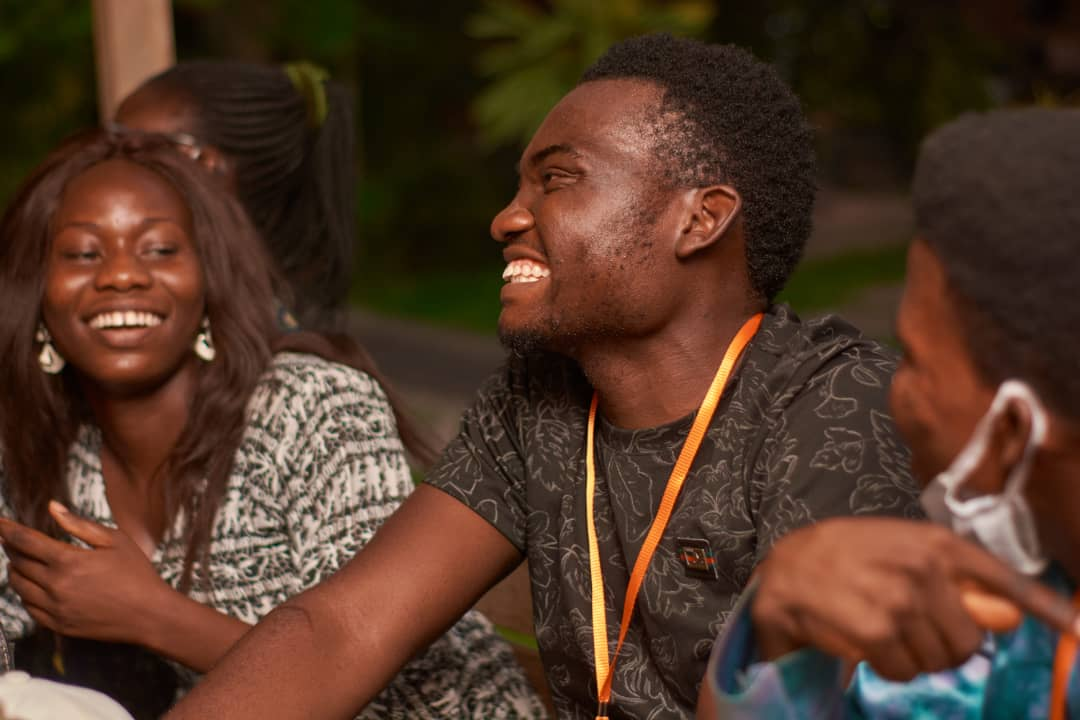
Youth in Nigeria

Youth in Nigeria includes citizens of the Federal Republic of Nigeria aged 18–29 years according to the new-youth policy (2019). However, the African youths charter recognises youths as people between the age of 15 and 35.

== History ==
Chief Olusegun Obasanjo, President of Nigeria from 1999 until 2007, called for addressing issues confronting Nigerian youth to improve overall national development. He stated that, "Youths constitute Nigeria's only hope for a greater future". The Nigerian government characterises youth as ambitious, enthusiastic, energetic and promising. They are considered vulnerable in society because of the rapid pace of change they experience at this time in their lives. Nigeria's Youth's right from time are notable to be change-agents and drivers of societal transformation. In contrast, in a developing country like Nigeria, youth interests and roles have been undermined, resulting to poverty, alienation, destabilization and conflict among the youths.

A National Youth Development Policy was created and designed in 2009 to advocate for youth. The goal is to promote the "enjoyment of fundamental human rights and protect the health, social, economic and political well-being of all young men and women in order to enhance their participation in the overall development process and improve their quality of life." The policy focuses on 18 priority areas, including education, health, agriculture, women & girls, peace-building, HIV/AIDS, migration & human trafficking, poverty and participation.

== Parental concerns ==
1. Drug Abuse – 40%

2. Early pregnancy

3. Internet fraud or cybercrime

4. Alcohol Abuse

5. Sexting

6. Get rich quick syndrome.

== National Youth Policy ==
The 2009 National Youth Policy recognizes 5 priority areas. These include the impact of globalisation, access and use of communication technology, the impact of STDs and HIV/AIDS, intergenerational issues in an ageing society, and youth perpetrators and victims of armed conflict. This is guided by several national and international policy initiatives, including National Policies for education, gender, health, population for sustainable development and the National Economic Empowerment Development Strategy (NEEDS). The Millennium Development Goals, the African Youth Charter, and other international agreements further guide the policy goals found in the document.

National Youth Policy prioritises the difficulties faced by women which include less occupational opportunity, physical violence, abuse and labour exploitation. The policy seeks to protect their rights and promote female youths' interests and goals. By empowering females, restoring their dignity, establishing programs to end gender-based discrimination and promoting their rights. National Youth Policy places emphasis on the needs of young women.

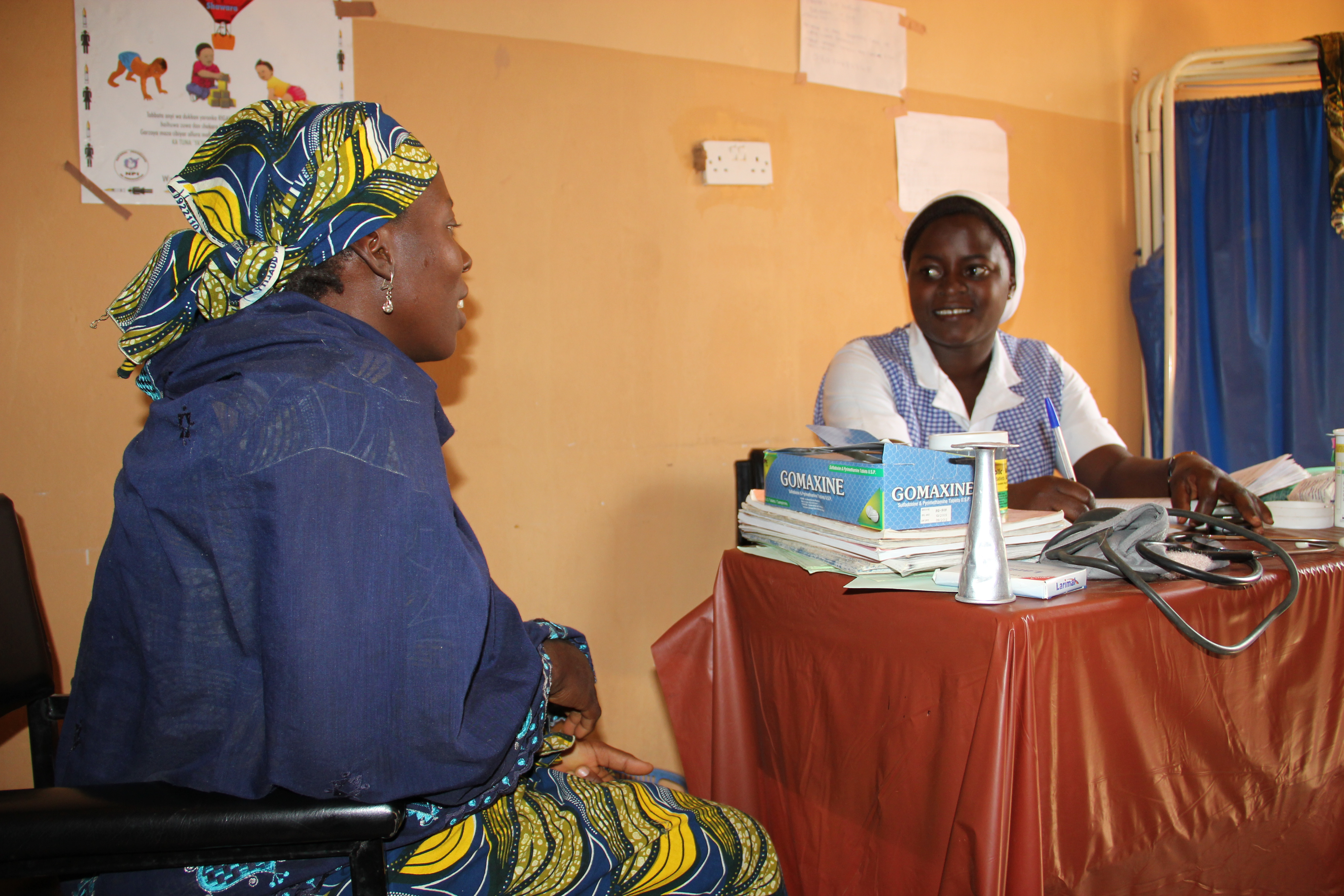
Women involved in health training in northern Nigeria

The National Youth Policy has adopted a program for disabled youth based on the premise that persons with disabilities have rights that should be protected by the government. The program promotes awareness of struggles that the disabled face, removing negative attitudes, while empowering the young men and women with disabilities.

== National Youth Council of Nigeria (NYCN) ==
The National Youth Council of Nigeria (NYCN) was founded in 1964 to be the voice and the umbrella Organisation for youth organisations in the country. It is responsible for issues affecting Nigeria's youth because it is the voice of nigerian youth. The Youth Council is non‐governmental, non‐partisan, and not‐for‐profit organisation. The council comprises the National Executive Committee (NEC) of 23‐ members. The NEC members are democratically elected from their respective state chapters and its affiliated voluntary youth organisations.The National Youth Council of Nigeria is a major stakeholder in the implementation of the National Youth Policy, as an umbrella organisation for youth NGOs, and youth organisations across the country the NYCN pursues democratic norms at all times, embrace the principles of accountability and transparency in all its conduct, initiate and execute activities that are in consonance with the goals of the National Youth Policy. It has leadership structures at the National, 6 Geopolitical Zones, 36 States and the FCT, 109 Senatorial, 774 Local Government Areas and various LCDAs, and all Wards in Nigeria making it the biggest youth movement in Nigeria. In Delta State, Comr. Amb. Sagboje, Odiri Milton,.CLN is the current Chairman or also the Deputy National Secretary of the Forum of NYCN State Chairmen.

Aims and Objectives

Below are the main aims and objectives of the National Youth Council of Nigeria (NYCN):

1. To deep-root the culture of nation building and leadership building in our youths.
2. To increase the participation of the young people in the society, as well as in the decision-making process.
3. Positively influence policy issues affecting youth, by being a recognized partner internationally.
4. Promote cross breed of ideas and experiences, mutual understanding as well as equal rights and opportunities among youths in Nigeria.
5. Mobilize, organize and groom young people to be patriotic citizens and help put them back on track with focus on what they can give back to the society.
6. To ensure youths are trained as future leaders.

== Family formation ==
Some Nigerians live in extended large families with separate living quarters. A Nigerian child may be breastfed until the age of 2. Mothers believe there is a bond created between mother and child by breastfeeding. Educating children is regarded as a community responsibility in some ethnic groups. Parenting styles differ among cultures in Nigeria. Nigerian children adapt to one of three roles: authoritarian, authoritative, or permissive, depending on their culture.

Both boys and girls learn to be responsible and hard-working at age 5. Boys contribute to routine tasks outside the home such as helping with the livestock, and helping in the fields. Girls contribute inside the home by cooking and cleaning in the home. Elders tend to value boys higher than girls for their physical abilities and their ancestry. First, fifth, tenth, and fifteenth birthdays are marked by large celebrations providing food and drink in certain parts as a traditional celebration.

Nigerian urban youth develop romantic relationships that are kept a secret. Urban Nigerians are increasingly accepting meeting publicly; romantic relationships often lead to marriage. Cohabitation in urban areas is increasingly accepted prior to marriage while a romantic couple saves money to marry.

Marriage is a coming of age practice among some ethnic groups. The legal minimum age to marry is 18 in most regions. Coming of age practices vary among different cultures. The Tiv people perform a ritual by marking a girl's abdomen with four incisions to make sure they are capable of conceiving a child. The Okrika Tribe hold ceremonies to mark the stage when girls are ready for marriage; they will ask the lady to dance with half-naked, with their breasts opened. These girls are painted and judged by characteristics such as beauty, grace and chastity. The girls then run a race with young men chasing them. Muslim people arrange marriages for their daughters, placing the male's family finances as an influential factor when choosing her husband. Girls are expected to marry soon after finishing school.

== Education ==
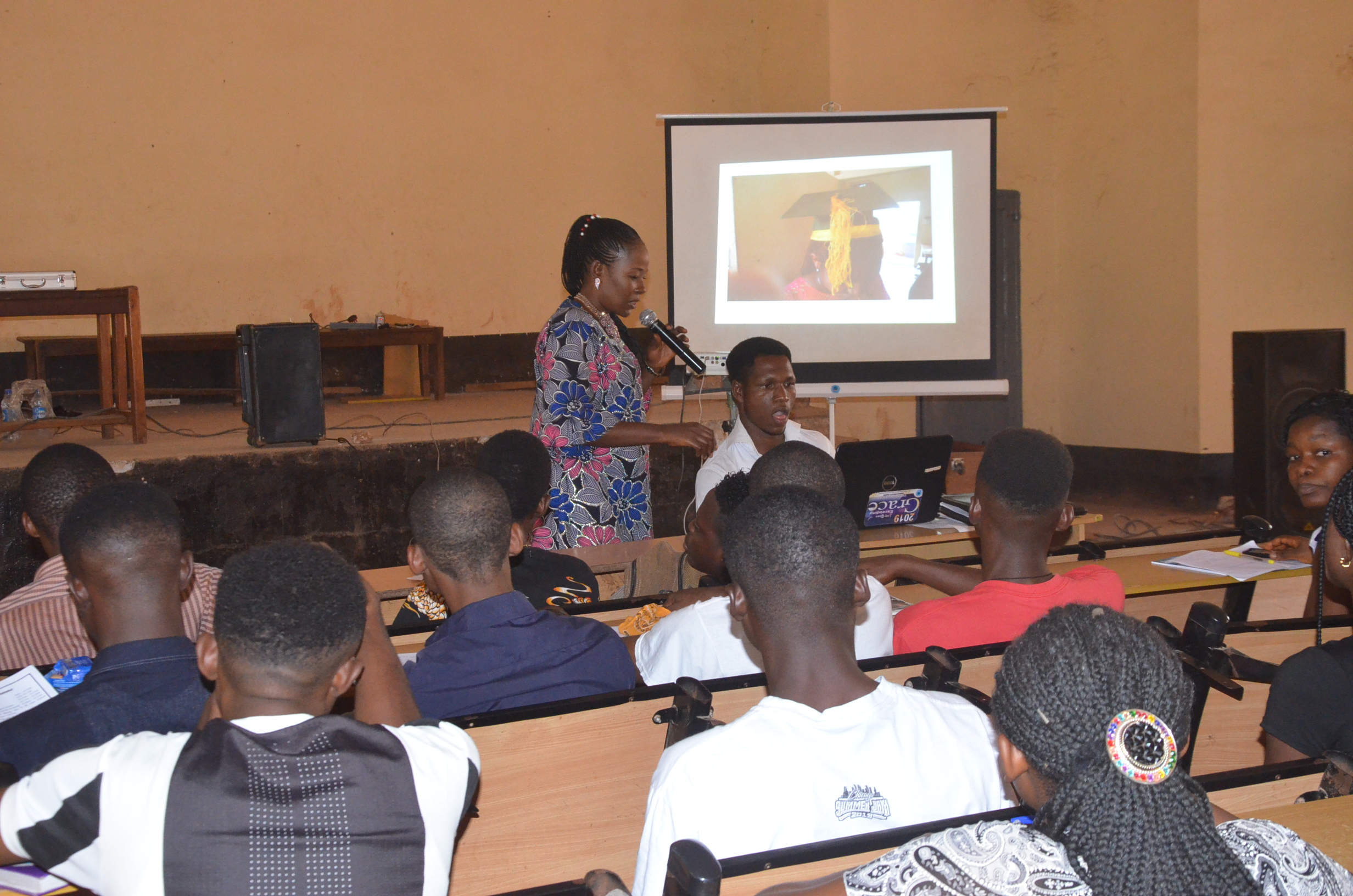
Teacher and students on Nsukka campus

. Youth in Nigeria school system consists of six years of primary education, three years of junior secondary, three years of senior secondary, and four or five years of tertiary education. Primary school completion rates are 93% for males, and 91% for females.

It is a requirement for every child in Nigeria to receive a minimum of nine years of free education. The government's dominant role with funding provides funds from the Universal Basic Education Commission (UBEC) and Education Trust Fund (ETF). Some of the problems Nigerian youth face in education are unbiased access to junior secondary, and senior secondary education for the poor, and the need to adjust the school curriculum to focus on the transition from school to labour economics.

The National Youth Policy has implemented a variety of focuses in hopes to improve overall quality of education. These focal points include: development of critical fields of knowledge in applied science and technology, technical skills, vocational skills in agriculture, and promotion of the use of Information and Communication Technology (ICT).

The policy developed leadership roles and life training skills which seek to keep youth focused on education, politics and overall youth agency. The youth are encouraged to partake in a variety of programs including: gang-related violence prevention programs, Extra-curricular competitive and recreational game activities through organisations, and a student union was launched encouraging leadership roles for youth and democratic culture.

== Labor and employment ==
Individuals in Nigeria can legally work when they are 18 years old. Data on youth employment in Nigeria are scarce due to under-resourced agencies responsible for their collection. In 2012, 11.1million youths in Nigeria were believed to be unemployed. In a recent report by Bloomberg, it was revealed that as at March 2021, Nigeria Unemployment rate has increased to 33.3% making it the second highest on the global list of unemployed countries monitored by Bloomberg. The report also revealed that Nigeria employment rate has increased drastically over the last five years because the country has been through two different recessions and this has cast a shadow of gloom on the economic policies implemented by the President Muhammadu Buhari administration. Due to some main identified problems such as; rural-urban migration, rapid population growth, low standard of education, the rapid expansion of the educational system, lack of steady and sustainable power supply and corruption. Nigeria youths constitute 64 percentage of unemployed Nigerians. There is high rate of unemployment which in turns caused insecurity, rising poverty rate and persistent underdevelopment.

In Q2 2024, Nigeria's youth unemployment rate (15–24) declined to 6.5%, down from 8.4% in Q1 2024, reflecting some improvement in job market engagement among young people.

== Health risks ==
Nigerian youth have experienced increasing rates of sexually transmitted diseases (STD's) and HIV/AIDS. Prevalence of female youths STD contraction is 17.2%. HIV/AIDS prevalence among all youths is 5.2%, compared to the national prevalence at 4.4%.The Federal Government of Nigeria's National Youth Policy attempts to mitigate prevalence by providing care, treatment and, support for infected young people. In doing so, government promotes prevention activities through risk reduction, abstinence, and condom use.

STD and HIV/AIDS contraction can cause serious, permanent health issues, infertility, death and, social consequences such as social exclusion. Many social factors contribute to the rates of contraction. Advancements in information communication technology expose youths to a variety of values and ways of thinking which differ from their elder generations. Cultural norms serve as barriers to protect themselves in many cultures. Condom use is not a common practice.

Infection rates among youths vary according to gender, region, education, marital status, and other factors. Gender norms constrain young women from controlling their reproductive and sexual lives. The highest rates of infection happened in the north-central part of the country (with Benue State having the highest prevalence rate), lowest in the Northeast. Urban areas have higher rates than rural places of residency. Youths with little or no education compromised 1.3% of infected youths, in contrast to higher levels of education whose rates were 4.7%. Prevalence of contraction was higher among youths who had never been married at 2.6%, in contrast to those who were married, 1.8%. Premarital sex is common, even though it is considered taboo in many ethnic groups. It is common in urban areas for inter-ethnic dating to occur, though, inter-religious dating does occur it is hardly present in society. Youth who had previous education and testing for HIV/AIDS had higher rates of STD contraction in contrast to those who had no awareness of HIV/AIDS.

== Suffrage ==
Nigerian youth have the right to vote in political elections at 18 years of age. Nigerian youth are campaigning for reduction in age qualification for political position with the Not Too Young To Run bill, which seeks to reduce the age to run for president from 40 years to 30 years; Governor 35 to 30, Senate 35 to 30, House of Representatives 30 to 25 and State of Assembly 30 to 25. The Not Too Young To Run bill was signed into law in May 2018 by President Muhammadu Buhari. The bill was signed in the presence of youth representatives from the 36 states of the federation. The bill is "aimed at relaxing some of the stringent and biased provisions of the constitution that prevent young people from participating actively in politics." During the signing of the bill, the president said "You can aspire for President but Please postpone your campaign till after 2019 election." This statement by Mr President points to the fact that the Nigerian society is yet to fully accept youth leadership and participation at the corridors of power.

== Youth in armed conflict ==
Since the Post Cold War era, oil based revenues and its disbursements in the Niger Delta region has led to massive protests and violence among youth. Young people have engaged in attacks against oil firms and Nigerian militants, hostage taking and hijacking oil workers, youth militancy, vandalising oil pipelines, and detonating bombs. Tension in the public has caused conflict among minority and majority groups which has crippled national and social development. The youth's participation in violence is their way of expressing feelings of marginalisation and that their voices are not heard in competing for beneficial resources.

=== Get rich quick syndrome ===
Many Nigerian youth are believed to have the get rich quick syndrome by the older population, the youths are now characterized with this 'get quick rich syndrome'. Many of them are now believed to be willing to die within eight years of enjoying flights of cars and billions of naira, this is a false idea. Nigerian youths are hardworking individuals who struggle to be resourceful despite the lack of jobs and unfair treatment in society, poverty is a main factor that creates the so-called 'get rich quick syndrome' in young adults in Nigeria.

== See also ==
- YouWin
- Edojobs
- #LazyNigerianYouths - 2018 social media revolt following comments by Muhammadu Buhari
