= Ijeoma Nwaogwugwu =

Nigerian journalist

- Born: Born 14 December 1966
- Citizenship: Nigeria
- Education: UNILAG
- Occupation: Journalist
- Employer: This day new paper

Ijeoma Nwogwugwu is a Nigerian journalist. She was the pioneer managing director of Arise TV, a Nigerian news outlet. She was one of the directors of Thisday Newspaper. She is also an editor at THISDAY newspaper. She is the second woman in Nigerian journalism’s history to be appointed editor of a national newspaper, the first being Doyin Abiola.

== Early life and career ==
Born 14 December 1966, in 2012, Nwogwugwu became the editor of THISDAY newspapers as the previous editor Simon Kolawole, was made the editorial director. This led to Kolawole's resignation as a protest.

In 2018, she was appointed to lead the Arise News Channel. She ranked the first among twenty-five most powerful women in Journalism according to WijAfrican (Women in Journalism Africa.

In 2020, she was listed as one of the Top 25 Most Powerful Women In Nigerian Media.

Till date Nwogwugwu is the only editor at This Day, to have edited the Saturday edition, the Sunday edition the daily title.

In Nigeria, she is the second woman to be appointed editor of a national newspaper, the first being Doyin Abiola.

Education: Wharton School of the University of Pennsylvania, UNILAG Nigeria
