= Ndukwe =

Origin
- Language: Igbo
- Meaning: Life agrees
- Region of origin: Igboland

Ndukwe is a surname and given name of Igbo origin that means “let life permit”. This was originally given as a plea, to children born after successive infant deaths or stillbirths.

== Notable people with this surname ==
- Chinedum Ndukwe (born 1985), American football safety
- Ernest Ndukwe (born 1948), Nigerian electrical engineer and telecommunications director
- Ifeanyi Ndukwe (born 2008), Austrian footballer
- Ijeoma Ndukwe-Egwuronu (born 1982), Nigerian entrepreneur
- Ikechuku Ndukwe (born 1982), American football offensive lineman

== Notable people with this given name ==
- Kalu Ndukwe Kalu (born 1954), Nigerian-American political scientist
