= Kelechi Francis Ibekwe =

Nigerian footballer

Ibekwe
Personal information
- Full name: Kelechi Francis Ibekwe
- Date of birth: 5 April 1984 (age 42)
- Place of birth: Lagos, Nigeria
- Position: Striker

Team information
- Current team: S.S. Calcio Giugliano

Senior career*
Years	Team	Apps	(Gls)
2002–2003	Trento Calcio 1921	14	(2)
2003–2004	Venezia	1	(0)
2004–2005	Castel di Sangro Calcio	27	(8)
2005–2006	S.S. Cavese	13	(1)
2006–	Venezia	12	(6)
2006–2007	Paganese Calcio 1926	31	(8)
2007–2008	Portogruaro	18	(2)
2008–2009	Venezia	26	(2)
- * Club domestic league appearances and goals as of 9 January 2013 ‡ National team caps and goals as of 5 June 2014

Kelechi Francis Ibekwe (born 5 April 1984) is a Nigerian football forward who currently plays for S.S. Calcio Giugliano in the Eccellenza.
