= Ijeoma Ndukwe-Egwuronu =

- Born: 12 May 1982 (age 43); Owerri, Nigeria
- Education: University of Calabar, International School of Communication (ISOC) London, Lagos Business School
- Occupation: Entrepreneur
- Website: bubezfoods.com

Ijeoma Ndukwe-Egwuronu (born 12 May 1982) is a Nigerian entrepreneur popularly known as Nwanyi Akamụ or Iyaologi in reference to her food processing business, Bubez Foods.

== Early life and education ==
Ndukwe-Egwuronu who grew up in Owerri, Imo State, is the first child in a family of six and started her early education in Assumpta Primary School, Owerri before moving on for high school at the Owerri Girls Secondary School. Subsequently, she went to the University of Calabar where she obtained a bachelor's degree in Human Physiology. She is married and have 3 children.

== Career ==
Ndukwe-Egwuronu founded Bubez Plaiz, a boutique retail store in 2004 and ran the business for 8 years before folding up in 2012 as a result of business bad debts. According to an interview she gave to The Guardian, Ndukwe-Egwuronu "went to God in prayer seeking an answer" to her problems and that was how Bubez Foods, a food processing business that utilized corn as a major raw material, was birthed. She has since experimented with several variants of her signature product, pap and currently has over 7 variants of the Bubez Pap Mixed Grains Paste. Ndukwe-Egwuronu is passionate about women empowerment. and in an interview with Vanguard, she stated that "women who deliver their jobs excellently should be given the opportunity to take their rightful positions in their chosen fields of endeavour". INdukwe-Egwuronuhas maintained that storage of raw products and finished goods remain one of the most challenging issue in Nigeria's Agriculture Value Chain.
